Electronic cigarettes are marketed to smoking and non-smoking men, women, and children as being safer than cigarettes. E-cigarette businesses have considerably accelerated their marketing spending. All of the large tobacco businesses are engaging in the marketing of e-cigarettes. For the majority of the large tobacco businesses these products are quickly becoming a substantial part of the total advertising spending. E-cigarette businesses have a vested interest in maximizing the number of long-term product users. The entrance of traditional transnational tobacco businesses in the marketing of such products is a serious threat to restricting tobacco use. E-cigarette businesses have been using intensive marketing strategies like those used to publicize traditional cigarettes in the 1950s and 1960s. While advertising of tobacco products is banned in most countries, television and radio e-cigarette advertising in several countries may be indirectly encouraging traditional cigarette use.

E-cigarette advertisements have had marketing messages containing pseudoscientific health claims. The available evidence demonstrates that e-cigarette aerosol is not just "water vapour" as is frequently asserted in their marketing. Widespread advertising and promotion included the assertion that vaping would present little risk to bystanders. Despite that, drawbacks and adverse effects have been cited in numerous articles, and the negative effects of its passive vapor have been shown in numerous studies. E-cigarette packages and advertisements require health warnings under US law, stating "WARNING: This product contains nicotine. Nicotine is an addictive chemical." E-cigarettes are marketing, among other things, as a tool to get around smoke-free policies by allowing users to "smoke anywhere." Assertions of effectiveness for giving up smoking are not supported by the available scientific evidence, according to a 2014 review. E-cigarettes are marketed to young non-smokers. Cost has been used as a marketing tactic on social media.

Celebrity endorsements are used to encourage e-cigarette use. E-cigarette products have appeared in movies, talk shows, and music videos. Sponsoring sporting events such as football, motor racing, golf, powerboat, and superbike racing are used as promotional tools for e-cigarettes. Most vape shops mainly use social media channels such as Facebook, Instagram, Yelp, Twitter, and YouTube and specific events accessible to the general public to market their products. E-cigarette marketing tactics have the possibility to glamorize smoking and enticing children and never smokers, even when such outcomes are unintended. E-cigarette marketing with themes of health and lifestyle may encourage youth who do not smoke to try e-cigarettes, as they may believe that e-cigarettes are less harmful and more socially acceptable. This belief may decrease one's concerns relating to nicotine addiction. E-cigarette advertising approaches have successfully spread to young adults and youth. The money spent in e-cigarette marketing has been accompanied with a rise in vaping in young adults and youth.

Containers for e-liquids (the liquid used in vape products) can seem tempting to children of all ages for many reasons. For example, some e-liquids may have labeling or advertising that misleads youth into thinking the products are things they would eat or drink –like a juice box, piece of candy, or cookie. There are still many unresolved questions with respect to how the selling and marketing of e-cigarettes ought to be regulated. Whether e-cigarettes reduce or increase health risks relies on an intricate and changing interactivity among the businesses marketing e-cigarettes, users, regulators, and scientists, among other things. In the US and many other countries, e-cigarettes are not subject to the same marketing and promotion restrictions that apply to traditional cigarettes. As a result, e-cigarette businesses are permitted to advertise on television and in mass media as well as through newer channels such as the Internet. Assertions of effectiveness as a quitting smoking tool have been seen in e-cigarette advertisements in the US, UK, and China, despite such assertions had not been supported by regulatory bodies.

Background 

Understanding the role of electronic cigarettes requires understanding the long history of tobacco use in the US, including the role of nicotine delivery, the multiple examples of "reduced-harm" products and associated health claims, and the impact of using tobacco products on the public's health. Since the late nineteenth century, when the "modern" cigarette came into use, scientists and public health officials have linked cigarette smoking to a remarkable number of adverse effects, and it is now recognized as the primary cause of premature death in the US. Correspondingly, for a century, manufacturers, scientists, entrepreneurs, and public health leaders have promoted or recommended product changes that might remove some of the harmful elements in cigarette smoke. E-cigarettes are among the latest products.

E-cigarettes are designed for users to inhale nicotine, flavors, and other additives through an aerosol (vapor). The claims and marketing strategies employed by the e-cigarette businesses, and the efforts made by others to develop scientific and regulatory tools to deal with these new products, both contribute to the current discourse on e-cigarettes. According to a 2016 US Surgeon General report, many lessons for assessing the potential (and future) consequences of these products can be learned from examining the relevant experiences of the past century, especially the introduction of novel products (including e-cigarettes as well as other tobacco and nicotine products) and the claims of reduced exposure to toxicants made by the industry and elsewhere.

Manufacturers can make the nicotine solution flavorless, but many businesses add flavors, including mint chocolate truffle, whiskey, bubble gum, gummy bears, and cotton candy. A US congressional report from spring 2014 accused e-cigarette manufacturers of using these flavors to appeal to youth, a marketing strategy that is prohibited for tobacco cigarettes because it is so effective at attracting young users. In contrast to tobacco products, e-cigarette sales were not age-restricted in 2014, and in 2012 an estimated 1.78 million students in grades 6–12 had tried the devices.

A 2015 review stated, "As tobacco consumption is being curbed, there is a growing demand for cessation. Pharmacological treatment of nicotine addiction remains an active area of research. There are many nicotine preparations (nicotine gums, patches, e-cigarettes and inhalational agents) that are freely available in most parts of the world. These products are being heavily promoted and marketed as magical remedies."

Philip Morris International 

As a component of a public relations scheme, one of the tobacco industry's approaches is to finance scientific research. For example, Philip Morris International created and financed the Foundation for a Smoke-Free World. The organization states that it will assist with the idea of "ending smoking in this generation by eliminating the use of cigarettes and other forms of combustible tobacco." In 2017, Philip Morris International stated that it will donate $960 million over a 12-year period to the organization. $80 million each year is approximately 0.1% of Philip Morris International's income and below 1% of its earnings. However, Philip Morris International allocates billions on various types of promotion and lobbying for the tobacco industry. The organization cannot be considered independent from Philip Morris International, as of September 2018. "Absent true independence achieved through structurally separating the funding, priorities and management of the Foundation from the existing prearrangement that clearly benefits Yach and PMI, the FSFW may function operationally to advance and amplify tobacco industry messaging and potentially exacerbate conflicts within public health," according to the journal Tobacco Control in 2018.

Philip Morris International states that the Foundation for a Smoke-Free World intent is to advance the end of smoking, but tobacco control advocates are skeptical, stating that the company continues to market traditional cigarettes that they know are not safe. By promoting the continuation of nicotine addiction with the use of vapes and heated tobacco products, by the tobacco industry still making money from the selling of these products, the Foundation for a Smoke-Free World is merely "a platform for its sponsor's latest products". In 2020, advocacy groups that are indirectly funded by Philip Morris International through the Foundation for a Smoke-Free World are putting out information that contradicts public health officials that are stating that the effect from the use of e-cigarettes is unknown as well as their potential for causing harm. The Global State of Tobacco Harm Reduction (GSTHR) dismissed the relationship between e-cigarette use and making individuals more susceptible to infection from COVID-19. "Such spin can take a dangerous toll, not just on public health but now on the global economy as well," stated Michél Legendre, a campaign manager at the not-for-profit Corporate Accountability International.

Philip Morris International anticipates a future without traditional cigarettes, but campaigners and industry analysts call into question the probability of traditional cigarettes being dissolved, by either e-cigarettes or other products like IQOS. Outside of an IQOS store in Canada, marketing included a display sign on the pavement with the message, 'Building a Smoke-Free Future'. Philip Morris International has opened IQOS stores in Japan and other places around the world. The emissions of Philip Morris International's IQOS product produce both aerosol and smoke. In 2012, Phillip Morris International researchers stated that this product produces smoke. Phillip Morris International made the decision in 2016 that the IQOS product does not produce smoke. In 2017, a commentary published in JAMA Internal Medicine was written by a Swiss scientist. That angered Phillip Morris International because it stated that the IQOS product generated smoke.

Death in the West is a 1976 anti-smoking documentary film. Reporter Peter Taylor got Helmut Wakeham, then vice president of Philip Morris USA's science and technology, to acknowledge that there are carcinogens found in regular cigarettes. Wakeham stated: "There are all kinds of things that are unhealthy...what are we to do, stop living?" Wakeham also stated, "The average doctor is a layman with respect to intimate knowledge of smoking and health." When Taylor pushed him again about the carcinogens, he responded, "Anything can be considered harmful. Apple sauce is harmful if you get too much of it." Taylor interviewed American cowboy Bob Julian next to a campfire. Julian stated: "I started smoking when I was a kid following these broncobusters." He added, "I thought that to be a man you had to have a cigarette in your mouth. It took me years to discover that all I got out of it was lung cancer. I'm going to die a young man." Julian died just a few months after being interviewed.

Overview 

In general, product marketing is designed to inform people about the products being offered (and thus develop brand "awareness") and to persuade people to buy particular brands (i.e., develop brand "preference"). Branding is particularly important for products considered to be "commodities," such as traditional cigarettes and e-cigarettes, where the offerings are similar and branding differentiates the products. Marketing is particularly critical for e-cigarettes, as new products must be introduced to potential users.

Like marketers of traditional cigarettes, marketers of e-cigarettes use a number of channels and tactics to advertise and promote their products. These channels have included extensive marketing on the Internet and advertising in mainstream media, including popular magazines, retailer point-of-sale advertisements, product placement on popular media, and even television commercials – an advertising option unavailable to traditional cigarette manufacturers because of regulatory policies.

By promoting e-cigarettes as the healthier option, tobacco companies are working to rebrand themselves. E-cigarettes are marketed as a smoking cessation tool, and their use is increasing particularly among middle and high school students in the US, but among adults as well. Despite the high prevalence of use, e-cigarettes have not been thoroughly investigated; the benefits and risks of their use are unknown, including the chemicals being consumed. Voluntary consumer and health-care reports cite hospitalization for pneumonia, seizures, disorientation, congestive heart failure, and hypotension as e-cigarette related. However, studies so far show mixed evidence, including no significant relationship regarding smoking cessation and e-cigarettes and potential for cessation, while others suggest e-cigarettes encourage "dual use" in conjunction with smoking tobacco. The usage of e-cigarettes is actively promoted. They are advertised on radio and television, and in print as occurred in the 1950s with tobacco.

In 2016, in an analysis in The BMJ, researchers stated:

Tobacco promotion and advertising is directly associated with tobacco consumption among the general public. Tobacco promotion and advertising is an important cause of tobacco use initiation and escalation among youth. Television and radio advertising of tobacco have been prohibited in the US since 1971, and the Family Smoking Prevention and Tobacco Control Act of 2009 established, through the US FDA Center for Tobacco Products, new advertising and promotions restrictions. These new regulations, however, do not extend the congressional ban on cigarette television advertisements to e-cigarettes or limit promotion tactics and the use of flavored liquids, all of which increase the appeal of these products to youth. E-cigarette companies market their products to children and adolescents by promoting flavors and using a wide variety of media channels – approaches used (with success) by the tobacco industry to market traditional tobacco products to youth.

E-cigarette companies, almost all of which are either owned or have an investment stake by major tobacco companies, use promotional tactics including: television advertisements targeted to stations with clear youth appeal; advertisements at the point of sale at retail stores; product web sites and social media; targeted advertisements through search engines and web sites that focus on music, entertainment, and sports; and sponsorships and free samples at youth-oriented events. The use of social media and youth influencers, in particular, seems to be the primary mechanism through which e-cigarette promotion has occurred. For example, while Juul appears to have spent little to no money on traditional advertising, it has had one of the most effective social media campaigns which help promote its product across the nation. Many of these e-cigarette methods of advertising are illegal for traditional cigarettes, precisely because such tactics promote youth initiation and ongoing tobacco product use.

Meanwhile, e-cigarette advertising has effectively reached youth. In 2016, 78.2% of middle and high school students – 20.5 million youth – were exposed to e-cigarette advertisements from at least one source. Exposure to advertisements increases intention to use e-cigarettes among adolescent non-users, and is associated with current e-cigarette use, even in a dose-dependent fashion, as increasing exposure is associated with increased odds of use. The increased use of and exposure to e-cigarettes among youth, combined with dramatic increases in advertising, have serious potential to undermine successful efforts to deglamorize, restrict, and decrease the use of tobacco products. Incorporating and extending tobacco advertising restrictions to include bans on e-cigarette product advertising and promotion in forms that are accessible to children and adolescents would be a crucial, evidence-based measure to decrease youth e-cigarette use.

The social media landscape is being dominated by pro-vaping messages disseminated by the vaping industry and vaping proponents, whereas the uncertainty surrounding e-cigarette regulation expressed within the public health field appears not to be reflected in ongoing social media dialogues. Latest generation e-cigarettes are resembling less and less their first generation cig-a-like counterparts and are being promoted not only as a smoking cessation device and safer alternative to smoking but also as a recreational activity whereby the user can create their own unique vaping experience with the use of flavors, device modification, and vape tricks.

Marketing expenditure 

In contrast to cigarette and smokeless tobacco businesses, e-cigarette businesses are not mandated to provide their marketing and promotional spending to the US Federal Trade Commission, therefore, the total amount they spend is uncertain, as of 2018. E-cigarette businesses have largely expanded their marketing spending. As of 2017, e-cigarette advertisement spending across every media channel is rising every year. As of 2016, the majority of the large tobacco businesses own at least one e-cigarette brand and these products are quickly becoming a substantial part of the total advertising spending. As of 2017, all of the large tobacco businesses are engaging in the marketing of e-cigarettes. Some traditional transnational tobacco businesses are vigorously competing against the independent e-cigarette businesses for market share. A 2017 review states that the "Increased concentration of the ENDS market in the hands of the transnational tobacco companies is concerning to the public health community, given the industry's legacy of obfuscating many fundamental truths about their products and misleading the public with false claims, including that low-tar and so-called "light" cigarettes would reduce the harms associated with smoking. Although industry representatives are claiming interest in ENDS because of their harm-reduction potential, many observers believe that profit remains the dominant motivation."

Between January 1, 2008, and June 30, 2012, 131 different brands advertised their e-cigarette products. The majority were e-cigarette brands and there were a few retailer brands such as Vaporium. In 2013, blu accounted for more than 60% of expenses. In 2013, Njoy, Fin, Mistic, and 21st Century Smoke accounted for the remaining top 5 promotional expenses. Six large e-cigarette businesses in the US spent $59.3 million on promoting e-cigarettes in 2013, which was more than double the amount spent in 2012. These businesses employed many techniques previously used to market traditional cigarettes that are prohibited, such as television advertisements and sponsorship of music festivals. These marketing tactics are known to lead youth to start smoking, and some, including television advertisements, have been prohibited for traditional cigarettes for well over a decade. US e-cigarette marketing expenditures increased from $3.6 million in 2010 to $125 million in 2014, which translated into rapid increases in youth e-cigarette use. In just three years leading up to 2015, the amount of money spent on advertising e-cigarettes increased more than 1,200% or 12-fold in the US. In recent years leading up to 2017, there has been an upsurge in e-cigarette marketing spending in the US. In the US and Canada, over $2 million is spent yearly on promoting e-cigarettes online, according to a 2015 report. E-Lites, Vype, SKYCIG, NJOY, and Gamucci e-cigarette businesses spent a total of approximately £8.4 million on promoting e-cigarettes in the UK in 2013, across various outlets. British American Tobacco spent £3.6 million in the UK in marketing its Vype product in 2014. In 2014, SKYCIG (rebranded as blu eCigs or simply blu) stated they will invest £20 million in the UK in marketing efforts. Between 2015 and 2017, Juul spent $2.1 million in marketing efforts.

Manufacturers noticed the fast rise in consumer interest in e-cigarettes, so they quickly pushed to expand the sale of their products to brick-and-mortar retail stores. Sales of cigalikes and related products were first observed in Nielsen's store-scanner database in 2007, and between 2009 and 2012, retail sales of e-cigarettes expanded to all major markets in the US. This growth coincided with a surge in marketing expenditures by the e-cigarette companies across all media platforms The available evidence suggests that investments in e-cigarette advertising has been growing since 2012; that a variety of places they are being marketed such as mass media and online; and that promotional tactics differ among manufacturers. Marketing expenditures in 2013 were targeted at developed countries, where purchasing of traditional cigarettes may be, at that time, diminishing. Non-smoking promoters maintain the tobacco industry is marketing e-cigarettes to teens, as research indicates the developing market for traditional cigarettes will keep on dropping.

In 2016, the Royal College of Physicians released a report, stating "This escalation of marketing expenditure reflects the increased resources available following the wave of investments in e-cigarettes by the tobacco industry, with the latter's engagement in marketing raising distinct concerns." Millions of dollars spent on marketing aimed at smokers suggests e-cigarettes are "newer, healthier, cheaper and easier to use in smoke-free situations, all reasons that e-cigarette users claim motivate their use". E-cigarette manufacturers have deployed a significant amount in advertising to depict "vaping" as a publicly respectable and alluring activity. E-cigarette advertising expenditures increased sharply, while safety and long-term health effects are still opaque based on the available scientific evidence, as of 2018.

Although the e-cigarette marketplace is complicated by the differences in brands that are owned by tobacco businesses versus independent businesses, e-cigarette businesses continue to change and to influence the manufacturing, price, marketing and promotion, and distribution of e-cigarette products and accessories. The e-cigarette market has grown and changed rapidly, with notable increases in total sales of e-cigarette products, types of products, consolidation of companies, marketing expenses, and sales channels.

Market ownership 

Traditionally dominated by small start-up companies, the e-cigarette market has experienced rapid growth and transition, and more recently, large manufacturers and transnational tobacco companies have come to dominate the market, as of 2019. Major tobacco companies have entered the vaping industry by either acquiring e-cigarette companies and brands or developing their own products. Major tobacco companies now involved in the vaping industry include British American Tobacco, Imperial Brands, the Altria Group, Reynolds American, Philip Morris International, and Japan Tobacco International. These companies have benefited from large advertising and marketing budgets, which enable promotion across the World Wide Web. In 2003, Hon Lik created the modern e-cigarette. In 2004, the device was marketed in China as an alternative to traditional cigarettes. In 2006 it was launched worldwide. In 2012, Imperial Brands paid him the amount equaling EUR55 million to buy the patent. Vaping products are now a multibillion-dollar worldwide industry.

As traditional cigarette businesses have acquired the largest e-cigarette brands, they currently benefit from a dual market of smokers and e-cigarette users while simultaneously presenting themselves as agents of harm reduction. This raises concerns about the appropriateness of endorsing a product that directly profits the tobacco industry. Importantly, profit alone is unlikely to increase their market share, particularly in the highly restrictive regulatory environment in which tobacco businesses operate. In addition, the unequivocal refusal to associate with the tobacco industry which appears, if only for self-serving reasons, to support tobacco harm reduction, could unintentionally damage the credibility of the tobacco control community.

Regardless of their industry ownership, e-cigarette businesses would nevertheless have a vested interest in maximizing the number of long-term product users. The ethical onus then falls on governments to restrict the influence of industry through appropriate regulations targeting product manufacturing, availability, and use, devised in light of public health interests, a 2016 review stated. In 2014, the World Health Organization released a statement encouraging government bodies to restrict e-cigarette promotion and sponsorship, including ensuring that any advertisement does not target youth, non-smokers, or people not using nicotine. Insufficient regulation might contribute to the expansion of the e-cigarette market, in which tobacco businesses have a substantial stake, potentially renormalizing smoking habits and negating years of intense campaigns against traditional tobacco use.

Methods and claims

Tobacco industry marketing tactics 

An area of concern for the US Food and Drug Administration (US FDA) and other health organizations is with respect to how e-cigarettes are marketed to people, among other things. The marketing of e-cigarettes is common, and it is partly responsible for e-cigarettes becoming growingly popular. The entrance of traditional transnational tobacco businesses in the marketing of such products is a significant threat to restricting tobacco use. Big Tobacco transitioning from smokers to vapes has rekindled excitement in a formerly inactive marketing sector. "It's a marketer's dream," Brice O'Brien, R. J. Reynolds Tobacco Company's executive Vice President of consumer marketing, said. "Continuing the long tradition of designing products that appeal explicitly to new users, in recent years, tobacco companies have significantly stepped up the introduction and marketing of flavored non-cigarette tobacco products, especially electronic cigarettes (e-cigarettes) and cigars," the Campaign for Tobacco-Free Kids stated in 2017. E-cigarette businesses have been using intensive marketing strategies like those used to publicize traditional cigarettes in the 1950s and 1960s. E-cigarette advertisements are found in all forms of media, including television and radio where traditional cigarette advertisements were banned more than 40 years ago. Some e-cigarette advertisements from about the last two years leading up to 2013 looked very similar to tobacco advertisements appearing in the 1960s, 1950s, and 1930s.

Although the marketers of e-cigarettes have made claims that differ from those made for traditional cigarettes (such as use for smoking cessation, which is illegal without being an approved cessation drug or device), a 2014 content analysis of e-cigarette marketing and the observations of tobacco marketing surveillance systems point to several similarities, including the use of young, attractive models; lifestyle claims; and celebrities. Other claims made in e-cigarette advertising have been used in the past by traditional cigarette brands (such as having fewer carcinogens, lower risk of tobacco-related disease) or by smokeless tobacco products (such as the ability to use them where smoking is prohibited). However, under the deeming rule that was published in May 2016, after August 8, 2016, e-cigarette manufacturers cannot make modified risk claims (although this provision has been challenged in pending lawsuits).

The use of e-cigarettes or heated tobacco products is heavily affected by the marketing approaches of tobacco companies, is an area of concern. This is due to the large tobacco companies own a part of all the main nicotine-based products, including traditional cigarettes, as well as snus, e-cigarettes and heated tobacco products, as of 2019. There is a fair amount of controversy surrounding the marketing of e-cigarettes. The advertising and marketing of e-cigarette products has generated skepticism among public health professionals and legislators, who have noted many similarities to the advertising claims and promotional tactics used for decades by the tobacco industry to sell traditional tobacco products. E-cigarette businesses are using methods that were once used by the tobacco industry to persuade young people to starting using traditional cigarettes. Some e-cigarette marketing mimics the highly profitable tobacco advertising advocating, among other things, an independent existence and a freedom of choice. E-cigarette products are marketed with a variety of unsubstantiated health and quitting smoking messages, with some websites featuring videos of endorsements by physicians (another reprisal of old tobacco industry advertising). Stuart Elliot, a writer for The New York Times, stated in 2013 that "Some of the slogans, like 'A perfect puff every time,' echo classic tobacco cigarette taglines like 'Not a cough in a carload,' or 'A treat instead of a treatment.'"

Marketing messages and advertising 

Marketing messages echo well-established traditional cigarette themes, including freedom, good taste, romance, sexuality, and sociability as well as messages stating that e-cigarettes are healthy, are useful for smoking cessation, and can be used in smoke-free environments. These messages are mirrored in the reasons that adults and youth cite for using e-cigarettes. Large tobacco businesses have purchased some of the e-cigarette businesses and greatly increased their advertising expenditures. Large tobacco businesses are investing tremendously in these products and are utilizing polished marketing techniques mimicking those formerly used to glamorize and encourage young people to smoke. This marketing trend may normalize the use of a questionable product. Moreover, since they are intended to replicate the action of smoking; it may contribute to the re-normalization and re-glamorization of the action of smoking. E-cigarette companies do not use the word cigarette in advertisements because of its stigma.

In addition to television, e-cigarette advertisements are on the radio, magazines, newspapers, online, and in retail stores. Early on, e-cigarettes were mainly advertised online. From 2011 to 2013, e-cigarette television advertisement frequency rose 256%. At least 40 unique advertisements for e-cigarettes appeared on US television in 2013 and early 2014. Between 2010 and 2014, e-cigarettes were second only to traditional cigarettes as the top advertised product in magazines. The three most common media were print, television, and e-mail, and spending was highest for print advertisements, as of 2014. E-cigarettes are routinely marketed as a substitute to traditional cigarettes. E-cigarette advertisements regularly make claims. For example, they are advertised as being effective for quitting smoking. The most frequent advertised claims for e-cigarettes were, depicting them as a healthier substitute compared with traditional cigarettes, and as a tool to get around smoke-free policies. In addition to some e-cigarettes are designed to look like traditional cigarettes and be used in a similar way; the marketing of them in television and other venues encourages using them in a way that simulates using traditional cigarettes. Permitting vaping in working areas and public areas contributes to the re-glamorization of smoking, of which e-cigarette businesses are trying to accomplish via their marketing tactics.

A blu e-cigarette advertisement appeared in the Sports Illustrated Swimsuit Issue in 2014. Without showing the model's face, it depicted a bikini bottom adorned with the firm's name. It included the phrase "Slim. Charged. Ready to go." "The advertising just hit a new high in terms of chutzpah," Stanton Glantz, director of the Center for Tobacco Control Research and Education, said. The Sports Illustrated bikini advertisement entices youth, Vince Willmore, a representative from the Campaign for Tobacco-Free Kids, stated. blu ran printed advertisements that looked like warning labels in 2017. Those were "Important: Contains flavor", "Important: Vaping blu smells good"; and "Important: No ashtrays needed". The mocking warnings appeared in the June–November 2017 issues of well-known magazines such as  Esquire, ESPN, Rolling Stone, and Us Weekly. Although e-cigarette advertisements are not allowed to make direct claims that they are a lower risk in contrast to traditional cigarettes, some of blu's advertisements had other kinds of reduced-harm statements such as "Important: Less harmful to your wallet".

E-cigarette marketing targets diverse groups including older smokers but also young people. Some e-cigarettes are marketed as socially appropriate or even ethically better. For competitions in magazines, e-cigarettes have been offered as prizes. Using flavors in the marketing of e-cigarettes are areas of concern. E-cigarette marketing advocate weight control and emphasize use of nicotine with many flavors. These marketing angles could particularly entice overweight people, youth, and vulnerable groups. E-cigarette advertisements have had marketing messages containing pseudoscientific health claims. Several e-cigarette brands are stating in their advertising about vitamin vaping and help with weight management for reduced appetite. E-cigarette marketers are stating on their websites that vitamin vaping may assist with controlling weight. VitaminVape, VapeFully, VitaStik, and NutroVape offer products that are similar to e-cigarettes that they say do not contain nicotine and that they provide vitamins and nutrients. NutroVape states that its product provides "nutritional supplements," and VitaminVape suggests that the effects of vaping Vitamin B is like getting an injection of Vitamin B. In New York City in 2016, neon signs were used to advertise the most recent flavors. A marketing tactic may be packaging an e-cigarette to look like a traditional cigarette pack. Marketing approaches employed by e-cigarette businesses include giving out samples free of charge. Gamucci set up a 323-square foot designated vaping area in 2013 in a departure room of Terminal 4 at Heathrow Airport. The vaping area allows people to vape and sample Gamucci's products.

Some marketing specialists stated that product features such color seem to be directed at women. VMR Products designed an e-cigarette called Vapor Couture that is directly targeted at women. Vapor Couture comes in colors such as "deep purple" and "rose gold." Flavors such as "bombshell" and "strawberry champagne" are intended to appeal to women. Vapor Couture has been promoted through point-of-sale marketing and engaging with bloggers. A video advertisement for Vapor Couture e-cigarettes directed at women stated, "break free from the pack" with the "slim, sleek, sparkling" devices in shades that come "straight off the runway." Vaping Vamps designed an e-cigarette that is unambiguously targeted at women. Anna Breslaw, a writer for the website Jezebel, "argues that the Vaping Vamps are problematic – not because they're targeted to women, but because they don't offer anything new to consumers besides a 'girly' package."

Marketing on social media 

E-cigarettes are heavily promoted across all media outlets. E-cigarette businesses promote their e-cigarette products on Facebook, Instagram, YouTube, and Twitter. Promotional content created by people are seen on Facebook, Instagram, and YouTube. Online blogs and forums contain promotional content created by e-cigarette users. A 2017 review found "The rise of new media has enabled the tobacco industry to penetrate channels such as Twitter and YouTube with information offsetting tobacco control denormalisation strategies, of which the electronic cigarette industry is now capitalising on." E-cigarettes are being promoted at popular events and venues, in addition to, on business websites, social media, and via other online places, including Groupon. E-cigarette brands use websites to interact directly with their customers through direct-to-consumer marketing (e.g., direct mail and direct e-mail). A cartoon character called Mr. Cool appeared on blu's website as well as on YouTube in 2014. Vapestick designed an old-fashion looking PC game dubbed Electronic cigarette wars. In 2013, an e-cigarette advertisement was seen in an iPad game designed for children. In October 2013, British American Tobacco, owner of Vype e-cigarettes, was notified by educator Graham Brown-Martin with a tweet to British American Tobacco's business account about the advertisement in the My Dog My Style HD children's game. The company withdrew its advertising and stated: "We've investigated and found a breach of protocols by third party used by ad agency. It's unacceptable and we're taking the issue seriously." Marketing firms are tweeting on Twitter to promote vaping and regularly include links to where they can be purchased online. Some business Twitter accounts have promoted vaping as a quitting smoking aid. E-cigarettes have been heavily marketed across Twitter feeds, offering discounts, "kid-friendly" flavors, algorithmically generated false testimonials, and free samples. They are also marketing online through promotional videos that provide information on how to use such products. E-cigarette businesses, such as Eonsmoke, have paid YouTubers to have their products reviewed on YouTube. Most of the YouTube videos associated with vaping portray this activity as a safe and cool replacement to smoking. E-cigarette businesses have advertised online on Google Search, Yahoo! Search, and Bing. The evidence indicates e-cigarettes are being marketed on social media as a harm reduction alternative, with retailers and manufacturers utilizing marketing techniques historically used by the tobacco industry.

An important determinant of the popularity of the product is product marketing. For instance, previous research has shown that product marketing plays an important role in the perception of the product for potential users of e-cigarettes. Factors that increased the likelihood of potential users to try an e-cigarette were as follows: no health warnings, the presence of flavors, and low or no nicotine content. Similar findings have been reported for waterpipe products. Smokers and recent quitters appear receptive to e-cigarettes when exposed to advertisements of the products. Recently as of 2018, a whole new possibility for marketing has become available through social media. Retailers can easily advertise and promote their products to a large audience through websites such as Twitter and Instagram. These marketing aspects of the products themselves and in advertisements can lead to fast increases in the popularity of products and should therefore be considered when evaluating the market developments of new products.

Between Juul's 2015 launch and fall 2018, their marketing campaign "was patently youth-oriented," a 2018 Stanford Research Into the Impact of Tobacco Advertising report concluded. Juul's launch was accompanied with sampling events in large US cities. Young people handed out Juul devices without cost at movie and music events. "The principal focus of these activities was to get a group of youthful influencers to accept gifts of Juul products" and "to try out their various flavors, and then to popularize their products among their peers," a 2018 Stanford Research Into the Impact of Tobacco Advertising report states. In 2015, Juul started a campaign titled "Vaporized". As part of their multimillion-dollar advertisement campaign for the Juul device, the company had a vividly colored billboard displayed in Times Square and a featured spread in the July issue of Vice magazine. The advertisements on billboards, in magazines, and on social media depicted models that appeared to be in their 20s. Juul advertisements looked like cigarette advertisements, according to a different study from the Stanford Research Into the Impact of Tobacco Advertising. Juul paid people who have a substantial audience on Instagram to publicize their products. The people Juul paid frequently posted images of young people using the Juul device, or were performing tricks or were being humorous with their own device. Juul has used launch parties to provide free product samples. Greater than 1,500 samples were handed out at every launch party. Visitors at the launch parties in New York City and other places were encouraged to post selfies on social media. After a 2010 law was revised to include e-cigarettes, Juul started asking people to pay a $1.00 for the device. Juul does "very little marketing," a representative from the company, stated in 2018.

Concerns have been expressed in relation to the youngness of the men and women depicted in the Juul advertisements along with the design of the device, which critics maintain gives a false impression with regard to the possibility of addiction. There has been substantial discussion relating to Juul on Instagram, YouTube, Twitter, and Reddit and other social media platforms. A 2018 report stated, "Because the audiences of these platforms disproportionately represent youth and young adults, Juul's marketing and promotion on social media may increase the appeal, experimentation, initiation and use of Juul among that population." Juul publicized its sugary flavors as one of the foremost reasons to using the device. A 2016 Juul advertisement states to "Save room for Juul" and states the flavorings are "easy to pair with your favorite foods." In August 2017, a Twitter advertisement for Juul's "creme brulee" pods suggested to people to retweet if they savored the "dessert without the spoon." In May 2018, Juul's Twitter account had no age restrictions and "these kind of social media posts can increase exposure to pro-e-cigarette imagery and messaging, by making JUUL use look cool and rebellious."

Juul stated in June 2018 that it has a new approach for social media. Moving forward, Juul will not depict models in photographs posted on Facebook, Instagram, or Twitter. Juul will utilize former smokers who now use Juul. In a pre-written statement, Kevin Burns, the CEO of Juul, wrote: "While JUUL already has a strict marketing code, we want to take it one step further by implementing an industry-leading policy eliminating all social media posts featuring models and instead focus our social media on sharing stories about adult smokers who have successfully switched to JUUL. We also are having success in proactively working with social media platforms to remove posts, pages and unauthorized offers to sell product targeted at underage accounts. We believe we can both serve the 38 million smokers in the U.S. and work together to combat underage use – these are not mutually exclusive missions." The shift in social media priorities comes at a time when they are trying to deal with the rising young users' use of its products.

E-cigarette businesses have offered consumers a free 14-day trial for e-cigarette products. The "free trials" for e-cigarette products are offered online. Cost reductions are offered via social media on the Internet. For instance, a Facebook page had the message: "V-Shisha sunshine promo!! Save 20% ... off our 5-pack of 0% nicotine, fruity and sparkly disposables." On social media, products are advertised and sometimes offered for free such as batteries for e-cigarettes. Alternatively, free shipping or discounts up to 10% are offered for various products. This offering of products with reduced pricing involves dozens of messages monthly. Manufacturer or importer websites sometimes offer the possibility to become an ambassador of their product line. Such an ambassador is expected to set up a community to share experiences and being active as a blogger or on social media. Some marketing activities were specifically aimed at youth by focusing on youth culture. For instance, pop-up bars set at various events and locations are part of the campaign of the e-cigarette "Juul." The "bar" in this case is a vapor lounge with brightly colored billboard display. In addition, images or cartoons of a young woman were shown in advertisements. Other advertisements were aimed at smokers who would switch from cigarettes to e-cigarettes, describing the technology of some products as "developed by smokers," "same feeling as a real cigarette," or "smoking the healthy way."

E-cigarette businesses have a robust existence in social media, which bolters their marketing efforts. E-cigarette marketing and advertising online, including countries where such products are not permitted to be used, may promote their use. Independent e-cigarette businesses use social media for promotion of their e-cigarette products. E-cigarettes have been marketed on Facebook even though its policy does not allow for promotion of such products, and in a lot of these cases, age restrictions have not been implemented. In 2018, in the journal Tobacco Control, Stanford researchers stated that less than 50% of the pages they visited, related to nicotine products, restricted the access to individuals who were below 18 years of age. Fruit flavored e-liquid is the most commonly marketed e-liquid flavor on social media. Flavor plays a significant role for the marketing of e-cigarettes online, which encourages users to communicate with one another, in addition to, providing a positive experience to the user. In 2018, the journal Tobacco Control found that Juul advertised mainly on social media rather than in other venues such as on billboards or in magazines.

Vape retail websites and social online accounts have made an array of direct and indirect marketing assertions, the majority being related to assertions about health benefits, reducing harm compared with tobacco, and providing aid to giving up smoking. A 2014 report evaluated 59 vape retail websites in 2012 stated that the most prominent assertions were that the products are safer, less costly, and cleaner compared with traditional cigarettes; may be used anywhere; may be used in places where smoking is not allowed; will not create passive smoke; and are stylish. Assertions associated with health using text and imagery and video with depictions of doctors have been seen. Assertions associated with quitting smoking were also observed.

E-cigarettes are vigorously advertised, mostly via the Internet, as a quitting smoking or minimization tool, and a less costly and more eco-friendly, socially agreeable, and safe substitute to traditional cigarettes. A 2014 review stated, these claims have been evaluated in studies. The conclusions of those studies were conflicting and mixed.

aInformation not available.

Impact of marketing on use 

The expansion in the marketing of e-cigarettes is believed to be contributing to the escalation in product awareness. Numerous small e-cigarette businesses are promoting e-cigarette in every possible way. E-cigarette vendors have marketed their products as a cheaper and safer smokeless alternative to traditional cigarettes and a possible smoking cessation tool. Consequently, many cigarette smokers have turned to e-cigarettes, and the number of e-cigarette smokers is increasing. In recent years leading up to 2014, on the international market, e-cigarettes have been widely advertised via television, radio, magazines, newspapers, and the Internet. This mass marketing and commercialization of e-cigarettes is estimated to increase consumer awareness and the future use of e-cigarettes.

"Brand awareness is raised through promotion in the press, trade press, magazines, television, company websites, sponsorships, online promotions and social media," according to a 2013 Cancer Research UK report. In 2014, the International Union Against Tuberculosis and Lung Disease expressed concerned that the marketing, awareness, and use of such products is increasing exponentially. While advertising of tobacco products is banned in most countries, television and radio e-cigarette advertising in several countries may be indirectly encouraging traditional cigarette use. Marketing and advertisement play a significant role in the public's perception of e-cigarettes. Exposure to e-cigarette advertising influences people to try them. Seeing e-cigarette advertisements online is linked with greater positive views of e-cigarettes, a more likelihood of use, while seeing them at retail locations is linked with greater positive views and a more likelihood of use.

Cigarette smokers were found to be more likely to be susceptible to the e-cigarettes advertisements than non-smokers. The results of a web-based 2015 survey indicated that exposure to e-cigarettes advertisements might enhance interest in trying e-cigarettes, particularly among cigarette smokers. In a 2015 study of 519 adult smokers and former smokers who seen a television advertisement for blu e-cigarettes on the Internet, 76% of smokers stated that it resulted in them to ponder about using traditional cigarettes, 74% stated it resulted in them to ponder about giving up using traditional cigarettes, and 66% stated it resulted in them to consider going on to use an e-cigarette. The 34% of the people who took part in the study who had vaped were much more likely to ponder about using traditional cigarettes after seeing the advertisement compared with non-users. This study indicated that seeing an e-cigarette advertisement could incite thoughts relating to smoking and prompt the desire to smoke. E-cigarette television advertisements could be attracting previous tobacco users to use a traditional cigarette.

As a result of the large-scale marketing, e-cigarettes gained widespread pervasiveness among all age groups, including vulnerable adolescents and youths populations. The proliferation of e-cigarettes as well as the Juul pod device and other pod devices seems to be associated with millions of youth who had seen their advertisements and social media promotions. In various high income countries, a rise in marketing has led to a rise in the use of vaping products. The increased prevalence of vaping among males can be due to sociocultural characteristics or marketing messages and current trends. There are growing concerns that e-cigarette advertising campaigns unjustifiably focus on young adults, adolescents, and women.

A 2017 study found that being exposed to e-cigarette advertisements resulted in the belief that vaping is safer in contrast to cigarette smoking in women typically, and pregnant women. A 2016 experimental study of youth found that "participants exposed to flavored e-cigarette advertisements rated them as more appealing than those exposed to non-flavored e-cigarette advertisements." E-cigarette advertisements with warnings could strengthen e-cigarette harm perceptions, and lower the likelihood of buying e-cigarettes. Some e-cigarette businesses that use cartridges state their products are 'eco-friendly' or 'green', despite the absence of any supporting studies. Some writers contend that such marketing may raise sales and increase e-cigarette interest, particularly among minors.

Safety 

Since about 2006, e-cigarettes have been widely marketed as a 'cleaner' type of recreational nicotine product than traditional cigarettes in the US, UK, and Europe. Tobacco manufactures have vigorously promoted the use of alternatives to traditional cigarettes with supposedly safer tobacco products, such as e-cigarettes, as a way to lower the harms of tobacco. The objective of the tobacco firms is to maintain their sales by using marketing tactics that de-emphasize the harms and focus attention on e-cigarettes as a "much safer alternative" to traditional cigarettes while publicizing flavors that are enticing to children.

E-cigarettes are marketed to smoking and non-smoking men, women, and children as being safer than traditional cigarettes. A 2015 report states, "they are being marketed as safe for recreational use by the general population." Unsupported or exaggerated assertions about safety and quitting smoking are recurring marketing strategies used to target smokers. Although they are marketed as being safer than traditional cigarettes, the accuracy of this assertion is unknown, as of 2014. A 2017 review states, "there are no definite conclusions regarding the safety and long-term health effects of electronic cigarettes; however, there is evidence that they are being marketed online as a healthier alternative to traditional cigarettes." E-cigarettes are frequently presented as a healthier, less costly, and cleaner option than tobacco smoking; assertions that are supported with little scientific evidence, and as products change, these assertions may become irrelevant.

In 2014, the Forum of International Respiratory Societies released a position statement, stating "Electronic cigarettes are nicotine delivery devices that have rapidly gained popularity because of marketing and the belief that they are safe and helpful for cessation of cigarette smoking. The health risks of these products, however, have not been adequately studied." E-cigarette marketing is of particular concern, because it is creating an illusion that e-cigarettes are safer and healthier than traditional cigarettes, whereas their safety is still a matter of ongoing debate. E-cigarettes are marketing as being safer than traditional cigarettes, but there is a lack of available evidence to adequately support that view. A 2018 review stated, "Manufacturers of e-cigs claim that their products are nontoxic, but multiple adverse effects including pneumonia, wheezing and coughing have been associated with them." E-cigarettes are promoted as being safe to use in contrast to traditional cigarettes, though they are not absence of hazardous substances. A 2017 review stated, "There is a justifiable concern that any broad statement promoting e-cig safety may be unfounded considering the lack of inhalational toxicity data on the vast majority of the constituents in e-cigs. This is particularly true for individuals with existing lung disease such as asthma." A 2016 review states "various tobacco products are being commercially marketed such as 'reduced exposure,' 'light,' or 'nicotine-free' products including electronic cigarettes with different levels of nicotine, nitrosamines, and other toxic chemicals, claiming a reduced health hazard compared with regular brands. However, recent studies from our laboratory and others assessing the differential BBB [blood-brain barrier] toxicity of various cigarette products have challenged the claimed safety of these reduced or low-exposure cigarette brands."

E-cigarettes are asserted as being safe to use. Despite this, the US FDA has stated that e-liquids used in the e-cigarettes contained nitrosamines, diethylene glycol, heavy metals, and other contaminants that are possibly toxic. The marketing of e-cigarettes as being safe to use in contrast to traditional cigarettes is under dispute, because the e-cigarette aerosols are a significant source of toxic heavy metals. The available evidence demonstrates that e-cigarette aerosol is not just "water vapour" as is frequently asserted in their marketing. A 2014 report evaluated 59 e-cigarette business retail websites in 2012 and concluded marketing on the sites regularly asserted that e-cigarettes generate merely "harmless water vapor." Similar marketing techniques were being utilized in the UK. Assertions that e-cigarettes and nicotine are safe and even healthy are commonly found in the media and on business websites, is an area of concern. E-cigarette businesses commonly promote that their products contain only water, nicotine, glycerin, propylene glycol, and flavoring but this assertion is misleading as researchers have found differing amounts of heavy metals in the vapor, including chromium, nickel, tin, silver, cadmium, mercury, and aluminum. The widespread assertion that e-cigarettes emit "only water vapor" is not true because the evidence demonstrates e-cigarette vapor contains possibly harmful chemicals such as nicotine, carbonyls, metals, and volatile organic compounds, in addition to particulate matter. E-cigarette companies have advertised that substances including glycerin are "FDA approved" or "generally recognized as safe," but this classification is applicable to eating food rather than the inhalation of the e-cigarette aerosol.

Marketers of e-cigarettes have asserted that the "cancer causing chemicals found in tobacco cigarettes are not found in electronic cigarettes". A 2016 review stated, "Despite widespread promotion that e-cigarettes are safer than regular cigarettes due to less tar production, there are multiple chemicals found in these products. These include nicotine, formaldehyde, acetaldehyde, lead, acetone, copper, and cadmium. These compounds can be addictive and/or carcinogenic. For example, formaldehyde is an International Agency for Research on Cancer group 1 carcinogen." The makers and marketers of such products frequently assert that the products they offer are a safe substitute to smoking, especially because they do not generate carcinogenic smoke. Despite this, "no studies have been conducted to determine that the vapor is not carcinogenic, and there are other potential risks associated with these devices," a 2012 World Medical Association report stated. As of 2014, the e-cigarettes that were being marketed may have used a significant number of interchangeable components that enabled users to alter the composition of the inhaled aerosol. Provided that scientific evidence about the safety of e-cigarettes is largely inconclusive, marketing claims that use words such as safer to describe their products could contribute to confusion about their overall safety, especially among youth. Promoting a product by claiming that it is healthier than tobacco smoking, the leading cause of preventable death, is therefore controversial and may only have merit when targeting smokers who are contemplating quitting or reducing use.

Independent e-cigarette businesses have directed marketing efforts at smokers, stating it is a safe nicotine product. Statements that e-cigarettes are safe and beneficial in comparison to traditional cigarettes may hamper approaches to tobacco control. These products are being advertised as a harm reducing substitute. There is no evidence that the traditional cigarette brands are selling e-cigarettes as part of a plan to phase out traditional cigarettes, despite some stating to want to cooperate in "harm reduction". "Perceived and marketed as a 'healthier alternative' to conventional cigarettes, few data exist regarding the safety of these devices and their efficacy in harm reduction and treatment of tobacco dependence; even less is known about their overall impact on population health," a 2014 review stated. E-cigarettes were initially presented as being safer than traditional cigarettes, but marketing approaches may be surpassing such claims by connecting e-cigarettes with words identified with healthy foods. Some vaping brands assert that their devices will provide vitamins instead of nicotine. On social media sites these products are being advertised with images that include salads or split avocados. A 2018 review states that "The recent advent of 'vitamin vaping' and aggressive marketing by some e-cigarette companies that claim that vaping e-cigarettes containing a variety of vitamins (vitamins A, B12, C, and D) is worrying as at this current time, clinically determining the concentration of any given vitamin that is systemically absorbed by inhalation route is not possible."

The manner in which e-cigarettes are marketed greatly influence the beliefs of the users regarding their harms and benefits and making choices to use such products. Many cigarette smokers have turned to vaping because e-cigarette vendors have previously marketed their product as a cheaper and safer smokeless alternative to traditional cigarettes, and a possible smoking cessation tool. The US FDA rejected these claims, and in September 2010 they informed the President of the Electronic Cigarette Association that warning letters had been issued to five distributors of e-cigarettes for "violations of good manufacturing practices, making unsubstantiated drug claims, and using the devices as delivery mechanisms for active pharmaceutical ingredients." The marketing of such products as being safer than traditional cigarettes has resulted in a rise in their use in pregnant woman.

Marketing and other factors may differ in various countries, thus rates of use and the overall public health effects may not be identical. Many circumstances associated with the public health impacts of large-scale availability and unimpeded marketing of e-cigarettes have been discussed, including impacts on starting to smoke in youth, giving up smoking, dual use in long-term smokers, and going back to smoking in previous smokers. Fear exists that wide-scale promotion and use of e-cigarettes, fueled by an increase in the advertising of these products, may carry substantial public health risks. The rise in nicotine-containing products, primarily e-cigarettes, indicates that such products may be thought of as being safer in contrast to traditional cigarettes. Despite this, there still are many questions with regard to the public health impacts of such products.

Claims related to pharmaceuticalization are made, presenting e-cigarettes as medical nicotine products. By switching from traditional cigarettes to nicotine products, traditional transnational tobacco businesses could make money from smokers, new users, and from people who are interested in quitting smoking. Pharmaceuticalization constitutes the next stage of the tobacco industry, and another risk to public health.

Harm to bystanders 

Widespread advertising and promotion included the assertion that vaping would present little risk to bystanders. In spite of that, "disadvantages and side effects have been reported in many articles, and the unfavorable effects of its secondhand vapor have been demonstrated in many studies." E-cigarettes are marketed as "free of primary and second-hand smoke risk" due to no carbon monoxide or tar is expected to be generated during use. However, the health impact of nicotine and other ingredients, is an area of concern. Marketing efforts mislead people, who would be exposed to passive vapor, to perceive vaping as having been confirmed to be safe. A 2014 practice guideline by NPS MedicineWise states, "Although data on health effects of passive vapour are currently lacking, the risks are argued to be small, but claims that e-cigarettes emit only water vapour are nevertheless incorrect. Serum cotinine levels (a metabolite of nicotine) have been found to be similar in bystanders exposed to either e-cigarette vapour or cigarette smoke."

Addictiveness 

Some manufacturers of e-cigarettes voluntarily carried health warnings in their advertisements. Sellers in the US are not allowed to display advertisements for e-cigarettes or other electronic nicotine delivery systems (ENDS) without a health warning statement. E-cigarette packages and advertisements require health warnings under US law, stating "WARNING: This product contains nicotine. Nicotine is an addictive chemical." According to a 2014 review, the advertising of vaping on television and radio is large-scale marketing of a habit-forming nicotine product, which is in support of its recreational use, to a new group of users who have not previously viewed this type of marketing.

A 2019 World Health Organization report states that "Apart from the known harmful effects of nicotine on the developing brain, nicotine is addictive and could lead people, particularly young people, to take up more harmful forms of nicotine or tobacco consumption. Further, by using flavourings and branding strategies that appeal to young people, the industries involved in the manufacture and marketing of ENDS are employing tactics to expand their consumer base under the guise of contributing to public health work." To maintain continuing sales, independent e-cigarette businesses have directed marketing efforts at dedicated smokers, using the addictive substance nicotine. The assurance they give is that the nicotine being used is safe. Another tactic used to imply the safety of these products is that the e-liquid containing nicotine is typically labeled as "e-juice" and promoted in candy and fruit flavors, such as cotton candy, gummy bear, chocolate mint, watermelon, and grape. The fact that e-cigarettes contain nicotine is downplayed in e-cigarette advertising. Younger adults and youth who are experimenting with these products may not realize that e-juice contains the highly addictive chemical nicotine, and that the products are classified as a tobacco product. A 2014 review stated, "Children are targeted for addiction with the addition of flavorants including the addition of strawberry and chocolate to mask the otherwise bitter taste of the product." E-cigarettes are marketed with various amounts of nicotine, and the amounts of this substance absorbed is still not clear.

A point of contention for pro-regulation advocates is that e-cigarettes are yet another tobacco industry marketing ploy. Rather than a strategy designed to offset declining tobacco sales, public health researchers argue e-cigarettes are a vehicle to addict future tobacco consumers, as well as creating a new income stream in the meantime. One, in particular, argues that by using e-cigarettes in this way, the tobacco industry aims to negate the current cessation trend, re-glamorize tobacco and smoking, present nicotine as benign to younger people and re-addict ex-smokers. It is argued that e-cigarettes are not a big tobacco marketing ploy, and that on the contrary, laws banning nicotine products that are not tobacco or approved therapeutic products actually protect the tobacco industry's dominant market position – a dominance that e-cigarettes may break if they are not regulated out of the market.

"Smoke anywhere" 

E-cigarettes were initially advertised as a form of tobacco that could circumvent existing smoke-free legislation, with initial confusion as to whether existing smoke-free legislations also apply to e-cigarettes. Increasingly, smoke-free legislations banning combustible tobacco cigarette smoking in indoor public places have been amended to expand their coverage to e-cigarettes. Many exceptions exist. For instance, vaping is allowed in vape shops and also in venues that hold vaping conventions (even if the use of e-cigarettes is banned in those venues during other events). The US Surgeon General called on states and localities to include e-cigarettes in smoke-free policies. In order to protect the public from both second-hand smoke and second-hand aerosol, the US Surgeon General emphasized that smoke-free policies should be modernized to incorporate e-cigarettes, an approach that "will maintain current standards for clean indoor air, reduce the potential for renormalization of tobacco product use, and prevent involuntary exposure to nicotine and other aerosolized emissions from e-cigarettes". E-cigarettes are presented as a way to get nicotine where smoking is not allowed, but state and local representatives in the US have expanded their smoke-free air laws to also ban e-cigarette use in places where smoking is banned to prevent harm. As of October 1, 2018, 789 municipalities, 12 states, and two territories include e-cigarettes as products that are prohibited from use in 100% smoke-free environments.

A 2018 review stated, "E-cigarettes were initially advertised as a form of tobacco that could circumvent existing smoke-free legislation. Their increasing popularity brought initial confusion as to whether existing smoke-free legislation also applies to e-cigarettes." E-cigarettes are marketing, among other things, as a tool to get around smoke-free policies by allowing users to "smoke anywhere." E-cigarettes could also be used as a tool to get around policies against smoking by people who have a nicotine dependence that are less willing to give up cigarette smoking. Older adults are vaping as a way to give up smoking or to get around smoke-free bans, and they believe the marketing of such products makes smoking normal again. Frequent marketing strategies include aiding people to stop using traditional cigarettes and permitting people to maintain using nicotine in places where smoking is banned. Many advertisements state that e-cigarettes are a way to get around smoking bans, which undermines smoke-free social norms. Some e-cigarette marketing encourages continued use as a substitute to tobacco, and short-term use in public areas where smoking is not allowed.

E-cigarette marketing messages promotes "the freedom to enjoy the personal pleasures associated with smoking in places where conventional smoking has been banned." An-cigarette business highlighted this point by using the name Lite-Up Anywhere for its device. Another encouraged dual use, staying that its "smart plastic case [is] designed to fit snuggly in the pocket, protect the e-cig, and even house one regular tobacco cigarette for those adult smokers who chose to dual between the two."

The Action on Smoking and Health UK stated in 2013 that it "does not consider it appropriate to include e-cigarettes under smokefree regulations," upholding one of the e-cigarette businesses' main marketing pitches that vaping can be done everywhere without the limitations and social stigma associated with smoking. An undetermined amount of e-cigarette advertising uses misleading health claims and youth is among its targeted audience, which encourages disobedience in opposition to smoke-free regulations. E-cigarettes are marketed for use where smoking is not allowed and due to their similarity with tobacco products it is possible that using them where smoking is not permitted, will result in enforcing bans on smoking harder.

A major drawback of traditional cigarettes is the smoke they emit, which is known to contain thousands of chemicals dangerous to human health, and for this reason, traditional cigarettes are now subject to smoking bans and smoke-free policies all over the world. E-cigarette proponents frequently highlight the smoke-free aspect of vaping and that these devices can be used where tobacco is currently restricted. Marketing that accentuates that e-cigarettes can be used anywhere may undermine enforcement of smoke-free policies and tobacco control efforts and expose non-users to toxicants. A 2015 survey of a representative sample of American adults found that increased frequency of exposure to e-cigarette advertising was associated with lower support for policies that restrict use in public places. These results suggest the need for more publicly available information regarding the chemical composition and possible health consequences of inhaling second-hand vapor.

Shortly after UK researcher Kate Hunt seen e-cigarette advertising on television, an unsolicited e-mail arrived on January 16, 2014, promoting an 'e-cig starter kit'. This showed 'Megan' (attractive, slim, elegant, professional, confident and happy) 'smoking' an e-cigarette, apparently on a plane. Incongruously, the e-cigarette billows smoke. The sender's address and titles of embedded links suggest the ease of trying e-cigarettes, and that e-cigarettes are healthy and inoffensive. Ingeniously, the advertisement can be read as showing that holding a cigarette object is attractive and socially desirable, and that e-cigarettes are (somewhat) distinct from 'ordinary' cigarettes. Within present legislation in 2014 in the UK, 'Megan' can 'smoke' her e-cigarette in public spaces because e-cigarettes are not subject to smoke-free regulation. E-cigarettes can also be advertised, although some may question whether a 'smoking' e-cigarette complies with guidelines.

Smoking cessation 

Advertised as a quitting smoking tool, vaping has received a fair amount of controversy but the experimental research on this topic has been limited. Marketing of e-cigarettes may encourage continual use as a replacement for tobacco. E-cigarettes are being promoted as a quitting smoking tool to assist smokers to reduce the number of traditional cigarettes used. It is also promoted that they may be used along with traditional cigarettes. E-cigarettes are repeatedly promoted as possible replacements to nicotine replacement products. They are also advertised for use as nicotine replacement products. Some businesses are using or may use e-cigarette advertising to encourage smoking, deliberately or unintendedly, are areas of concern. E-cigarettes are advertised as a way to quit smoking, though they could also act as a gateway to traditional cigarette use, is an area of concern.
E-cigarettes are marketed for quitting smoking, but it is uncommon youth use them for this reason.

A 2019 review found "Vaping has been promoted as a beneficial smoking cessation tool and an alternative nicotine delivery device that contains no combustion by-products. However, nicotine is highly addictive, and the increased use of nicotine-containing e-cigarettes among teens and individuals who are not in need of smoking cessation may lead to overall greater nicotine dependence in the population." A 2019 review found these "devices have rapidly become the most common tobacco products used by youth, driven in large part by marketing and advertising by e-cigarette companies. There is substantial evidence that adolescent e-cigarette use leads to use of combustible tobacco products."

Businesses have promoted e-cigarettes for quitting smoking since their entrance into the market, but there has not been an e-cigarette approved as a quitting smoking tool by US FDA, as of July 2015. Businesses are marketing e-cigarettes in an indirect way as quitting smoking tools, but no e-cigarette has been approved for this type of use by the US FDA. E-cigarette businesses have made indirect claims regarding quitting smoking via consumer testimonials. Statements from e-cigarette users supporting their effectiveness for quitting smoking have appeared in promotional materials. In September 2008, the World Health Organization released a report, stating that "marketers should immediately remove from their web sites and other informational materials any suggestion that WHO considers it to be a safe and effective smoking cessation aid" because "WHO has no scientific evidence to confirm the product's safety and efficacy."

There is limited supporting evidence to back up the direct and indirect marketing assertion that vaping will assist smokers to give up or cut back their use of traditional cigarettes. Despite massive advertisements asserting the benefits of vaping for giving up smoking, several studies concluded that the use of e-cigarettes did not result in completely abstaining from smoking. Assertions of effectiveness for giving up smoking are not supported by the available scientific evidence, according to a 2014 review. Many e-cigarette businesses market their products as a smoking cessation aid without evidence of effectiveness. E-cigarette marketing has been found to make unsubstantiated health statements (e.g., that they help one quit smoking) including statements about improving psychiatric symptoms, which may be particularly appealing to smokers with mental illness. E-cigarettes are being advertised by businesses as a harmless device to assist with quitting smoking, but the available evidence does not support this claim. "Manufacturers and distributors mislead people into believing these devices are acceptable alternatives to scientifically proven cessation techniques, thus delaying actual smoking cessation," a 2012 World Medical Association report stated.

One concern is that e-cigarette advertising may perpetuate dual use of traditional cigarettes and e-cigarettes, a concern that comes from the visual depictions of e-cigarette use that may serve as smoking cues to current and former smokers of traditional cigarettes, increasing the urge to smoke and decreasing intentions and efficacy to quit or abstain from smoking. Consistent with cue-reactivity studies about traditional cigarettes, exposure to e-cigarette use in a laboratory was associated with increased urge to smoke traditional cigarettes among smokers and an urge to use e-cigarettes among users of that product. Whether exposure to depictions in advertising of the use of e-cigarettes triggers urges to begin or continue to smoke traditional cigarettes or weakens users' resolve to quit has received little attention. Some research indicates much smaller proportions of e-cigarette advertisements are now endorsing these devices as quit aids, and cited reasons for use by vapers have significantly shifted away from smoking cessation toward use to increase social image. Of concern is that these results suggest that e-cigarette uptake is not solely driven by a desire among smokers to quit smoking.

Marketing to non-smokers 

E-cigarettes are marketed to non-smokers. Of concern is their potential to make attitudes towards tobacco smoking more positive (i.e., to renormalize it) through, for example, marketing of objects that appear very similar to tobacco cigarettes that appeal to both adult and children who are non-smokers. The extensive marketing and advocacy through various channels broadens exposure to e-cigarette marketing messages and products; such activity may encourage non-smokers, particularly young adults and youth, to perceive e-cigarette use as socially normative. E-cigarettes are promoted to a certain extent to forge a vaping culture that entices non-smokers. It has been suggested that these devices may be a less harmful alternative to smoking, provide health benefits to smokers who switch completely to them, lessen cigarette cravings, and facilitate smoking cessation. However, promotion of e-cigarettes may also encourage non-smokers, particularly young people, to initiate use, facilitate experimentation with traditional tobacco products, and undermine tobacco control efforts.

Independent e-cigarette businesses have directed marketing efforts at non-smokers by promoting them as lifestyle accessories, among other things. E-cigarettes are marketed at young non-smokers as being socially appealing and part of a fast expanding trend. The aim for independent e-cigarette businesses with selling to non-smokers (as well as smokers) is to maximize profit using a 'next generation' product. Many non-users (as well as users) perceptions regarding vaping were consistent with an array of unsupported assertions that were regularly stated in the advertisements of such products such as vaping is a healthy substitute compared with smoking, is an area of concern. A 2014 review stated that it would be appropriate to implement restrictions on the marketing of these products to non-smokers. Concerns have been raised that the marketing directed at young adults and non-smokers could undermine the WHO Framework Convention on Tobacco Control.

An e-cigarette advertisement for the firm VIP appeared on television in 2014, which depicted a woman using an e-cigarette. Professor Martin McKee, of the London School of Hygiene and Tropical Medicine, commented that the advertisement was "highly sexualised and gives the impression at being aimed at non-smokers." A spokesperson for VIP told BBC that "This advert will mark the first time in almost 50 years that TV audiences see someone exhale what appears to be cigarette smoke on an advert. However, it is actually vapour from an e-cigarette that they will see." In 2015, The Lancet stated, "The advertising company who created one of these adverts actually described it in a tweet as the first 'smoking' advert in 50 years, before realising their mistake and deleting the tweet."

Cost 

E-cigarettes are marketed to adult smokers as a less costly and safer substitute to smoking. Independent e-cigarette businesses have directed marketing efforts at smokers, stating it is less expensive than tobacco. E-cigarette businesses are using reduced cost promotions to entice new buyers. For example, starter kits are offered at a lower price for new buyers.

Cost has been used as a marketing tactic on social media. Price promotions are not just involved in sales at brick-and-mortar stores; they are also offered by online stores and through social media. A 2014 report found that 80% of websites indicated a sale price or discount, while another 2014 report found that 34% of commercial tweets mentioned the words "price" or "discount." Both Facebook and Twitter provide opportunities for brands and companies to offer online coupons and discounts. In a study of online e-cigarette retailers, 28% of the websites offered a promotion, such as a discount, other free items, or a loyalty program. Without age restrictions or age verification, youth can access these websites easily and thus obtain the discount or coupon. However, under the US FDA Deeming Rule of 2016, websites cannot sell e-cigarettes to youth under the age of 18, so access will likely be curtailed as a result.

A substantial portion of e-cigarette marketing on social media includes price promotions, discounts, coupons, free trials, giveaways, and competitions. These types of incentives can persuade potential consumers to make a purchase and assist vendors to create a loyal customer base, which has already been demonstrated for tobacco. It is well documented that smoking behaviors react to changes in cigarette prices, and in response, tobacco control efforts have sought to eradicate the use of these incentives. Similarly, studies have reported that e-cigarette sales are very responsive to price variation, and implementing policy to limit price promotions, free-trials, and giveaways could lead to significant behavior change and uptake. People who use e-cigarettes regularly cite smoking cessation as their motivation for vaping initiation; for this group of people, price promotions that enable affordability of these products longer term could be viewed as appropriate, although evidence supporting the use of these devices as a smoking cessation aid is still out for debate, as of 2019.

Celebrity product endorsements 

Celebrity endorsements are used to encourage e-cigarette use. Celebrities have endorsed e-cigarettes at least as far back as 2009. E-cigarette businesses have partnered with a number of music icons to promote their products. Celebrities endorsing vaping products appear on social media. Musician Bruno Mars invested in NJOY and endorsed the product in 2013. On May 12, 2013, he posted on Twitter a photograph of himself using the NJOY product. Musician Courtney Love appeared in a NJOY e-cigarette television advertisement in 2013. Actress Jenny McCarthy endorsed blu e-cigarettes in 2014.

E-cigarette marketing methods are like those of tobacco in that they have penetrated the Hollywood scene, with e-cigarette products showing up in movies, talk shows, and even in the goodie bags provided to the nominees of the 84th Academy Awards. They were seen on The Doctors and The Late Show with David Letterman. Hollywood celebrities in the US have discussed on television talk shows that they vape to assist them with giving of smoking. Katherine Heigl took a drag off of her e-cigarette during her appearance on The Late Show with David Letterman. Her use of the product on The Late Show with David Letterman on September 27, 2010, was highlighted on the firm's website that sells the product. East Enders and Lewis in the UK, for instance, have had characters vaping on these television shows. Shows including The Alan Titchmarsh Show have promoted vaping through appearances.

They are also marketed to celebrities. E-cigarettes were handed out for free to guests at the 52nd Annual Grammy Awards. In the US, they have been promoted in some movies. Johnny Depp's character was seen vaping in the 2010 movie The Tourist. Milla Jovovich's character was seen vaping the device SmokeStik in the 2014 movie Cymbeline. SmokeStik paid to have their product in the movie. In 2015, e-cigarettes appeared on HBO in the drama True Detective. O'Shea Jackson Jr.'s character was seen vaping in the 2017 movie Ingrid Goes West. NJOY partnered with Robert Pattinson for an e-cigarette advertisement, who appeared in the Twilight movies. Singers Sevyn Streeter and Chris Brown participated in a music video that drew attention to an e-cigarette brand, as part of a product placement agreement. E-Lites appeared in a music video by Lily Allen. Lily Allen was paid by E-Lites to put them in the Hard out Here video in 2013. Hollywood celebrities who have had their picture taken with a vape include Leonardo DiCaprio, Dennis Quaid, and Kevin Connolly. E-cigarette business websites have highlighted photographs of A-list celebrities who have used the products that they have offered. E-cigarette companies have associated their name or image of their product to celebrities such as the group Girls Aloud "puffing on e-cigarettes to cope with the stress of their 10th anniversary tour."
 

A 2012 national US television advertising campaign for e-cigarettes starred Stephen Dorff exhaling a "thick flume" of what the advertisement describes as "vapor, not tobacco smoke", exhorting smokers with the message "We are all adults here, it's time to take our freedom back." Opponents of the tobacco industry state that the blu advertisement, in a context of longstanding prohibition of tobacco advertising on television, seems to have resorted to advertising tactics that got former generations of people in the US addicted to traditional cigarettes. Cynthia Hallett of Americans for Non-Smokers' Rights described the US advertising campaign as attempting to "re-establish a norm that smoking is okay, that smoking is glamorous and acceptable". University of Pennsylvania communications professor Joseph Cappella stated that the setting of the advertisement near an ocean was meant to suggest an association of clean air with the nicotine product.

Sponsorship of events 

Sponsoring sporting events such as football, motor racing, golf, powerboat, and superbike racing are used as promotional tools for e-cigarettes. A 2014 US Congressional report indicated that e-cigarette manufacturers had sponsored or handed out e-cigarette products at a considerable number of youth-oriented events, such as baseball games and at a Six Flags amusement park. Most of the events discussed in the 2014 US Congressional report appear to be at bars, big concerts, and music festivals. NJOY sponsored the fall 2013 Fashion Week, the 2013 London Fashion Week, and the 2013 New York Fashion Week.

E-cigarette businesses have partnered with a number of sports events to promote their products. In May 2011, it was announced that Green Smoke sponsored a NASCAR driver. E-cigarette businesses have sponsored events such as the Coachella Valley Music and Arts Festival. R. J. Reynolds was the sponsor of the "Kool Jazz Festival" but has moved on to sponsor other various public events. In 2013, a football field in Wales was renamed 'The Cigg-e Stadium' following the club's agreement to a three-year partnership with the e-cigarette brand. Nicolites sponsored the Birmingham City Football Club for the 2013–14 season. E-Lites obtained partnership agreements and specified spaces for e-cigarette use in the Celtic and Rangers football stadiums in 2013. E-Lites sponsored the British Superbike Championship in 2013 and 2014.

After the Master Settlement Agreement in 1998, sponsorship of events with a significant youth audience, such as concerts and athletic events, was banned for traditional cigarettes. However, e-cigarettes do not fall under these parameters, and recalling the early marketing of traditional cigarettes, e-cigarette brands have used sponsorships to increase the awareness and appeal of their label and product. For example, in 2011 blu sponsored a NASCAR driver and had its own car in some races. Additionally, blu has handed out free samples during large events and has even sponsored events at music festivals. blu sponsored the Bonnaroo Music Festival in 2013. Further, conservative estimates indicate that in 2012 and 2013, free samples were provided by six e-cigarette businesses at 348 events, most of these events having high participation by youth. Under the US FDA Deeming Rule published in May 2016 (under litigation in 2016), free samples were banned.

Sponsorship of research 

Biased research paid for by the tobacco industry continues to be rampant in the e-cigarette topic area, as of 2019. The tobacco companies have had an impact on research-based conclusions by providing funding for scientists. The extent to which research related to e-cigarettes has ties to businesses and other special interests in this industry, is an area of increasing concern. In 2010, Arbi Group Srl from Italy, who is a vaping distributor in Europe, sponsored a large amount of research by a group at the University of Catania in Sicily, who organized and carried out a randomized trial, which was cited in a 2015 Cochrane review. The University of Catania researchers have been coordinating 9 of the 48 e-cigarette trials, that were registered with the National Institutes of Health, as of 2015. Professor Riccardo Polosa of the University of Catania, who constructed the trial, stated that, "At the end of the day we were stuck accepting money from e-cigarette owners because there was no other way to carry out research." That is a problem, according to Danish doctor Charlotta Pisinger, who works at quit-smoking clinics. In a 2015 review she stated that a third of vaping studies had a conflict of interest because they were paid for by vaping businesses, pharmaceutical businesses and/or tobacco businesses. She noted that "We must exercise the utmost caution in trusting their conclusions." 95.1% of research without and 39.4% of research with a conflict of interest came to the conclusion that vaping is potentially harmful, while just 7.7% of research associated with the tobacco industry concluded that they are potentially harmful, as of 2019.

In 2013, LOGIC sponsored a vaping study. In 2014, R.J. Reynolds Vapor Co., a division of Reynolds American, sponsored a study on vaping. Businesses, which include Imperial Brands, have sponsored a total of seven of the e-cigarette trials that were entered into the National Institutes of Health archive, as of 2015.

Altria made a minority investment in Juul Labs in 2018. Following the investment, Juul started JLI Science in 2019, which seems to utilize similar approaches used by tobacco companies to effect research on vaping. Research paid for by Juul is displayed on JLI Science's website.

In 2019, a review in the Translational Lung Cancer Research journal stated:

Marketing related to vape shops 

"A majority of vape shops primarily use social media outlets (e.g. 100% Facebook, 86% Instagram and Yelp, 65% Twitter, 38% YouTube) and special events open to the community (57%) for marketing. Few stores reported using print or broadcast media, with radio being the most popular venue (19%). About half (51%) of stores had external advertisements, and almost one-third had no signage related to sales to minors," according to a 2017 report. E-cigarette retailers may use YouTube to engage with customers and to disseminate largely unmonitored promotional messages. Vape shops have used the game Pokémon Go to market their products. "Vape shops in general have received a bad rep for their social element and for allegedly marketing toward children," Chris Bouton, a vape shop owner in Ypsilanti, Michigan, said in 2016. Marketing of e-cigarettes by tobacco shops was limited, with most responding that they do not market e-cigarettes, according to a 2018 report. Almost half have used social media, with others relying on word of mouth and price promotions. Vape shops utilized more diverse marketing channels, including radio, print media, and word of mouth. In-store marketing has been increasing, as of 2016. The most common form of marketing by vape shops is social media, which all vape shops cited using for marketing, the 2018 report concluded.

Anecdotal evidence suggests that vape shops currently do not have readily visible branded signs and displays that characterize the retail marketing of other tobacco products. Even though the relationship between the vape shop industry and the tobacco industry can be adversarial, a 2015 study found that the marketing practices of these establishments closely resemble the current and former strategies that tobacco companies have used to market other tobacco products. According to this study, vape shop owners and managers in Oklahoma used free samples, loyalty programs, sponsored events, direct mail, advertising through social media, and price promotions targeted at particular consumers, such as college students.

In 2013, a billboard on Interstate 95 in Miami, Florida, US portrayed Santa Claus using an e-cigarette. The text on the billboard read, "I don't always vape, but when I do, I choose Vapor Shark." Vapor Shark's billboard was criticized by vaping opponents. Some e-cigarette users opposed the advertisement. Aaron Frazier, an e-cigarette user, had stated on Vapor Shark's Facebook page, "Showing Santa vaping, globally recognized as a children's icon, is irresponsible and is and will be seen as a ploy to appeal to underage customers." The billboard featuring Santa Claus was reminiscent of the vintage tobacco advertisements, which for a number of years portrayed Santa Clause using a pipe or cigarette.

Cloud-chasing contests appear to be intended to bring in new shoppers and increase e-cigarette business. This marketing event may result in more teenagers being interested in e-cigarettes as well as traditional cigarettes.

A 2018 report assessed the packaging and labeling of 25 randomly selected e-liquids available for sale on online shops in the Netherlands. They found that nicotine content was often indicated in the advertisement text, but health warnings were generally not visible on product photos of the outer package nor on the website of the shop selling them. This is in contradiction to packages of regular cigarettes, almost all of which display a visible health warning on the package. Verification of age of the buyer and information on health effects of the product upon purchase were not clearly present when buying either tobacco or e-cigarette products online. In only a quarter of the visited online shops, an age verification was requested to gain access, which can still easily be circumvented by people under 18 years.

Marketing to young adults 

Themes in e-cigarette marketing, including sexual content and customer satisfaction, are parallel to themes and techniques that have been found to be appealing to young adults and youth in traditional cigarette advertising and promotion. E-cigarettes are marketed by promoting flavors and using a wide variety of media channels and approaches that have been used in the past for marketing traditional tobacco products to young adults (as well youth). E-cigarette advertising approaches have successfully spread to young adults. The money spent in e-cigarette marketing has been accompanied with a rise in vaping in young adults. Young adults receptive to e-cigarette advertising are more likely to go on to use traditional cigarettes, a 2018 study indicated. A small number of studies have investigated the influence on adolescents (as well as children) resulting from e-cigarette advertising and promotions.

Several e-cigarette businesses have begun offering college scholarships to students in order for their company name to appear on university websites. The scholarship offerings has garnered criticism as being a poorly hidden scheme to entice young shoppers. A 2017 study showed an e-cigarette business marketed their products to youth via advertisements on college admissions message boards, among other things. E-cigarette scholarships have appeared on economic-aid listings that includes Harvard, the University of California at Berkeley, and the University of Pittsburgh. This also includes schools who have opposed vaping. Independent e-cigarette businesses seem to be directing marketing efforts at younger people who have never smoked (or smokers who socialize), as well as positioning them as lifestyle products.

Young adult exposure to e-cigarette advertising 

Vaping is proliferating in young adults and youth as a result of the enticing marketing approaches positioning them as being safer substitutes to traditional cigarettes. An online panel of US young adults aged 18 to 21 (as well as youth age 13 to 17) conducted in February 2014 found that awareness of e-cigarette advertising was greatest for retail advertising, followed by awareness of advertising on television and online. Since 2011 young adults seeing e-cigarette television advertisements has risen, as of 2017. From 2011 to 2013, young adult seeing e-cigarette television advertisements rose 321%. Television e-cigarette advertising reached 64% of young adults aged 18 to 24 in the US, as of 2015.

An analysis of industry marketing data by the American Legacy Foundation (now called Truth Initiative) reported that 82% of young adults aged 18 to 21 (as well as 47% of US teens aged 12 to 17) were exposed to magazine advertising for e-cigarettes in 2014; popular venues included tabloids, entertainment weeklies, and men's lifestyle magazines. 57% of young adults aged 18 to 21 had seen e-cigarette advertising online in the US, as of 2015. Evidence indicated that young adults regularly had seen marketing associated with e-cigarettes on social media. A 2013 study suggested that younger people were more exposed to e-cigarettes advertisements than older adults, which provided a possible interpretation of the greater effect of cigarette smoking on e-cigarette use among adolescents.

In 2018, the Forum of International Respiratory Societies released a position statement, stating "Electronic cigarette manufacturers employ diverse and creative strategies to target marketing to adolescents and teens despite widespread bans on the sale of these products to persons less than 18 years of age. Advertising near middle and high schools, in neighbourhoods with high youth traffic, and on television commercials that appeal to youths are common approaches. Packaging and display choices, such as candy and fruit iconography on the packaging, displays close to candy, and marketing materials at or below 3 feet (1 m) all enhance interest by youths. For older adolescents and young adults, claimed safety benefits with flavoured electronic cigarettes have encouraged experimentation."

E-cigarette marketing, including product design and packaging, appeals to a young audience. For example, many e-cigarettes feature bright colors and fruit, candy, alcohol or other flavors that youth find attractive and interesting. Many themes in e-cigarette marketing, including sexual content and customer satisfaction, are parallel to themes and techniques that the tobacco industry aimed at youth and young adults in their advertising and promotion of traditional cigarettes.

Marketing to youth 

Tobacco businesses intensely markets e-cigarettes to youth. E-cigarette advertising approaches have successfully spread to youth. In many countries, e-cigarettes are marketed using various methods that are attractive to young people. With deliberate industry strategies like using cartoon characters and candy flavors such as fruit loops, it is not unexpected studies demonstrate a rapid rise in youth vaping. A 2017 review stated, "an area of great concern is the rapid rise in use of ECIGs, even if it only reflects occasional use, among adolescents. This rise may be due to in part to targeted marketing that includes advertisements, sponsorships, and social media, not to mention an array of attractive flavors that mimic those of candies, desserts, and alcoholic and non-alcoholic beverages." The marketing of flavored e-cigarettes, that impacts youth curiosity in trying them, is a major concern. Cartoon characters, which are also prohibited in traditional cigarette advertising for their youth appeal, are used by some brands and there are numerous youth-oriented designs for e-cigarette products, including "Hello Kitty." E-cigarette businesses state that their marketing is not geared towards children. Despite this, e-cigarettes are available in flavors such as bubble gum, cookies and cream, gummy bear, and strawberry. Commonly available fruity and sugary e-liquid flavorings are used to target children. Marketing approaches that may entice youth are the positioning of e-cigarette products in conveniently located places in stores, and social networking and the use of other technologies that are not associated with their use. E-cigarettes are promoted on YouTube by movies with sexual material and music icons, who encourage minors to "take their freedom back." The outcome of e-cigarette marketing on youth is not known. The impacts of intensive marketing strategies for e-cigarettes on future youth experimentation are not known, though decades of observation with traditional cigarette marketing would indicate greater use in youths is a distinct possibility. E-cigarette marketing has been aimed at children, the US FDA stated.

A 2016 review stated, "Aggressive marketing includes claims that these products are 'safe' or 'harmless' alternatives to cigarettes. Such promotional tactics can be misleading, as these products are associated with tobacco use initiation and progression to regular use, with resulting nicotine addiction, especially among vulnerable populations, such as youth." Intensive marketing that presents e-cigarettes as "new and improved" nicotine products are directed at adolescents. E-cigarette marketing tactics have the possibility to glamorize smoking and enticing children and never smokers, even when such outcomes are unintended. Areas of most concern associated with vaping by adolescents include mass marketing strategies. E-cigarette companies had used a marketing tactics that invited high schoolers to write articles about the health benefits of e-cigarette use. The winner would receive a scholarship of at least $250 or up to $5,000. This is an indirect form of marketing, although e-cigarette companies state their target audience is only adults. It is recommended that children should not be exposed to misleading promotion of e-cigarettes because the enticement of 'youthful cool' to their use does not benefit the public health. A 2018 meta-analysis of three studies confirms that exposing children to different e-cigarette advertisements (glamorous, healthful, flavored, or non-flavored) lowers their perceived harm of occasional tobacco smoking.

The US FDA in July 2009 expressing major concerns that vaping may be marketed at young people and fall short of relevant health warnings. E-cigarettes are promoted to a certain extent to foster a vaping culture that entices youth. This could lead to producing a whole new group of young people who are dependent on nicotine. Evidence has not shown that unrestricted access to e-cigarettes and intensive marketing that attracts youth are required elements of an approach to minimize combustible tobacco use. E-cigarette marketing with themes of health and lifestyle may encourage youth who do not smoke to try e-cigarettes, as they may believe that e-cigarettes are less harmful and more socially acceptable. This belief may decrease ones concerns relating to nicotine addiction. Several marketing and design product features seem to be more attractive for young people. For example, flavorings or lack of age regulation restricting laws have been implicated as reasons for youth susceptibility to e-cigarettes. An analysis of e-cigarette retail websites, marketing, and promotional campaigns demonstrated frequent appeals to adolescents such as use by celebrities, feature cartoons, and enhanced social activity as well as sexual appeal. E-cigarette websites regularly contain marketing statements that might appeal to a younger audience. The ease to get past the age verification system at e-cigarette company websites allows underage individuals to access and be exposed to marketing. Around half of e-cigarette company websites have a minimum age notice that prohibited underage individuals from entering. E-cigarette websites often made unscientific health statements in 2012.

For e-cigarettes, independent e-cigarette businesses targeting youth present them in creative packaging as well as a variety of flavors, among other things. Marketing efforts by independent e-cigarette businesses targeting youth include using social media platforms to give cost incentives. Promoting them online include using competitions and sales apps, directed at youth. The money spent in e-cigarette marketing has been accompanied with a rise in vaping in youth. Marketing tactics are partly responsible for the considerable and dramatic increase in vaping among adolescents. A 2016 review found "The reasons for the increasing use of e-cigarettes by minors (persons between 12 and 17 years of age) may include robust marketing and advertising campaigns that showcase celebrities, popular activities, evocative images, and appealing flavors, such as cotton candy." Marketing of e-cigarettes is often misleading and highly appealing to teens. Aggressive marketing has led to an increase in e-cigarette use and experimentation by youth. E-cigarettes are popular among teens and their easy availability, alluring advertisements, various e-liquid flavors, and the belief that they are safer than traditional cigarettes have helped make them appealing to this age group.

A 2017 review found that "The tobacco industry sees a future where ENDS accompany and perpetuate, rather than supplant, tobacco use, especially targeting the youth." Marketing approaches employed by e-cigarette businesses include the use of flavors that are enticing to children. A 2016 study found 11–16-year-olds English children exposed to e-cigarette advertisements highlighting flavored, in contrast to flavor-free products, did result in increased appeal and interest in obtaining and experimenting with e-cigarettes. In 2014, about 7 in 10 middle school and high school students – more than 18 million youth – said they had seen e-cigarette advertising. Retail stores were the most frequent source of this advertising, followed by the internet, television and movies, and magazines and newspapers. Tobacco companies have historically enlisted convenience stores, the type of store most frequented by youth, as their most important partners in marketing tobacco products and opposing policies that reduce tobacco use. More than 60% of convenience stores sold e-cigarettes in 2013, with almost one third selling e-cigarettes near candy, ice cream, slushie machines, or soda machines. Drug stores and pharmacies (other than CVS Pharmacy which will no longer sell tobacco as of September 2014), are also selling e-cigarettes at a rate higher than the state average in California (56% versus 44%), with 88% of those stores placing e-cigarettes visibly in the main check-out area.

Marketing, especially through social media, has a salient role in vaping promotion among adolescents; whereas retail stores are a prominent source of e-cigarette display. Four Scottish communities participated in a recent observational study in which a potential concern has emerged due to the placement of e-cigarettes, in 36% of stores, near to products popular to children. Youth exposure to e-cigarette marketing occurs at locations where products are purchased. Numerous flavors for e-cigarettes such as gummy bear, cotton candy, peanut butter cup, and cookies 'n cream appear as if they have an association with a candy shop or ice cream parlor. These flavored products with vivid packaging and sugary flavors are sometimes difficult to tell apart from the candy displays close to which they are commonly located in retail stores. Children are more frequently than older people to have made impulsive buys as a result of e-cigarette advertising at places where products are purchased.

Youth exposure to e-cigarette advertising 

Since 2011 youth seeing television advertisements for e-cigarettes has risen, as of 2017. In 2016, the relative absence of restrictions to date in the US has led e-cigarette marketing to permeate most media outlets through the likes of celebrity endorsements, images associated with youth culture, and statements encouraging consumers to reclaim lost freedoms. The increasing frequency and reach of advertising on television raises concerns about the potential impact of promoting nicotine products and renormalizing smoking through that medium, particularly for youth. E-cigarette advertisements seen by youth could increase the likelihood among youths to experiment with vaping. Exposure to e-cigarette advertisements is associated with higher odds of current e-cigarette use among US middle and high school students. Most of the methods being used today by e-cigarette businesses were used long ago by tobacco businesses to market traditional cigarettes to youth. It is not known the extent to which vaping appeals to youth that resulting from the various e-cigarette flavorings and advertising.

The leading e-cigarette brands have taken the position that their products should not be sold or marketed to youth, but advertising industry data showed that 73% of 12-17 year olds were exposed to e-cigarette advertising from blu, the most heavily advertised e-cigarette brand, a 2014 report indicated. Many television networks with a substantial proportion of youth viewers, are airing e-cigarette television advertising. E-cigarette advertisements have appeared on highly viewed broadcasts, including the 2013 and 2014 Super Bowls, which had more than 110 million viewers. E-cigarette businesses advertised to a large television audience in the US which included 24 million youth. Between 2011 and 2013, youth and young adults viewing e-cigarette television advertising had risen considerably. The channels to which e-cigarette advertising reached the largest numbers of youth (ages 12–17) were AMC, Country Music Television, Comedy Central, WGN America, TV Land, and VH1. From January 2013 to September 2013, blu advertised the most to youth and young adults, followed by FIN, Starfire, NJOY, and other brands. E-cigarette commercials ran in the course of the evening shows that were popular with teenagers and children, such as the televised show Breaking Bad. InStyle, Us Weekly, Star, Entertainment Weekly, and Rolling Stone are some of the tabloids and magazines with e-cigarette advertisements reaching millions of youth and young adults.

In school-based surveys in 2015 of middle and high school students in Connecticut in the US, gas stations and television were the dominant channels in which students reported recently seeing e-cigarettes advertised or sold. A different pattern was observed in a convenience sample in 2015 of college students in Hawaii, where the figures for seeing advertisements were 59%, online; 58%, television; 71%, malls; 41%, gas stations; and 47%, convenience stores.

Overall, exposure to e-cigarette advertising from at least one source increased each year during 2014–2016 (2014: 68.9%, 18.3 million; 2015: 73.0%, 19.2 million; 2016: 78.2%, 20.5 million) in the US. In 2016 in the US, exposure was highest for retail stores (68.0%), followed by the Internet (40.6%), television (37.7%), and newspapers and magazines (23.9%). During 2014–2016 in the US, youth exposure to e-cigarette advertising increased for retail stores (54.8% to 68.0%), decreased for newspapers and magazines (30.4% to 23.9%), and did not significantly change for the Internet or television.

Among US middle and high school students during 2014–2016, exposure to e-cigarette advertisements from any source increased from 68.9% (18.3 million) to 78.2% (20.5 million). In 2016 in the US, exposure was highest for retail stores (68.0%, 17.7 million), followed by the Internet (40.6%, 10.6 million), television (37.7%, 9.7 million), and newspapers and magazines (23.9%, 6.2 million). In 2016 in the US, exposure to advertising from any source was more prevalent among females (79.9%) than males (76.5%); non-Hispanic whites (79.6%) than Hispanics (77.0%) and students of other non-Hispanic races/ethnicities (73.6%); 8th (78.5%), 10th (81.0%), 11th (79.3%), and 12th graders (79.0%) than 6th graders (75.0%); high school students (79.2%) than middle school students (76.9%); current e-cigarette users (82.8%) than non-users (77.9%); and current users of other tobacco products (82.7%) than non-users (77.6%). Exposure to each advertising source was higher among current e-cigarette users and other tobacco product users than non-users during 2014, 2015, and 2016 in the US.

Overall in 2016 in the US, 28.3% of students reported exposure to e-cigarette advertising from one source, 21.2% from two sources, 16.7% from three sources, and 12.0% from four sources. Retail stores were the most common exposure source every year (2014: 54.8%; 2015: 59.9%; 2016: 68.0%), whereas newspapers and magazines were the least common exposure source (2014: 30.4%; 2015: 31.0%; 2016: 23.9%) in the US. The Internet was the second most common exposure source in 2014 (39.8%) and 2016 (40.6%); in 2015, television (44.5%) exceeded the Internet (42.6%) as the second most common exposure source in the US.

During 2014–2016, US middle and high school students' exposure to e-cigarette advertising significantly increased for retail stores (from 54.8% to 68.0%), significantly decreased for newspapers and magazines (from 30.4% to 23.9%), and did not significantly change for Internet and television.

In 2016, an estimated four in five (20.5 million) US youths, including 8.9 million middle school students and 11.5 million high school students, were exposed to e-cigarette advertisements from at least one source, a 13% increase over 2014. Exposure in retail stores increased 24% in 2016 compared with 2014, and was the primary factor responsible for the increases in exposure from any source during 2014–2016 in the US. Nearly seven in 10 youths (17.7 million) were exposed to e-cigarette advertising in retail stores in 2016; approximately two in five were exposed on the Internet (10.6 million) or television (9.7 million), and nearly one in four (6.2 million) were exposed in newspapers and magazines in the US. Given the US Surgeon General has established that a causal relationship exists between traditional tobacco advertising and youth tobacco product initiation, and given the association between e-cigarette advertising exposure and e-cigarette use among youths, efforts to reduce youth e-cigarette advertising exposure are an important component of comprehensive youth tobacco prevention efforts, according to a 2018 Morbidity and Mortality Weekly Report.

During 2014–2016 in the US, current users of e-cigarettes and other tobacco products reported higher prevalence of exposure to e-cigarette advertising than non-users. This is consistent with research documenting an association between e-cigarette advertising exposure and e-cigarette use. However, this relationship might not be limited to e-cigarettes; previous research has demonstrated that among US youths aged 12–17 years, receptivity to e-cigarette marketing is associated with susceptibility to traditional cigarette smoking. Prevention of youth exposure to e-cigarette advertising might, therefore, be important for prevention of youth use of all tobacco products, according to a 2018 Morbidity and Mortality Weekly Report.

The US Surgeon General has concluded that e-cigarette marketing employs strategies similar to traditional cigarette advertising tactics that have been proven to appeal to youths, such as themes of romance, freedom, and rebellion; celebrity endorsements; and health claims. Exposure to e-cigarette advertising might reduce youths' perception of harm associated with e-cigarettes and increase their beliefs that e-cigarettes can be used where smoking is prohibited. Product design features might also influence use. For example, Juul, the top-selling US e-cigarette brand, is an e-cigarette shaped like a USB flash drive that has a high nicotine concentration. According to news reports and social media posts, students are using Juul in school classrooms and bathrooms. In addition, e-cigarettes are marketed and promoted using strategies that are not legally permissible for traditional cigarettes, including television, sports, and music event sponsorships, in-store self-service displays, and advertisements placed outside of brick-and-mortar businesses at children's eye level.

Exposure to e-cigarette advertisements increased among US middle and high school students during 2014–2016. As part of comprehensive youth tobacco prevention efforts, approaches to reduce youth access to e-cigarettes and exposure to e-cigarette advertising could include regulation of youth-oriented marketing, restrictions on youth access to tobacco products in retail settings, and high-impact youth-focused tobacco education campaigns. These approaches, coupled with comprehensive state tobacco control programs, have the potential to prevent and reduce youth use of all tobacco products, including e-cigarettes, according to a 2018 Morbidity and Mortality Weekly Report.

In 2019, a review in the Current Atherosclerosis Reports journal stated:

Marketing to youth investigations 

In April 2018, the US FDA began investigating Juul's marketing approaches. They were under investigation by the US FDA to determine if they were marketing Juul to youth. The US FDA made an unannounced inspection of Juul headquarters in late September 2018 to gather information on their marketing methods, among other things. The US FDA collected over a thousand pages of information on the company. "The inspection followed the agency's request for information that we issued to Juul Labs in April for documents that would help us to better understand the reportedly high rates of youth use and the youth appeal of Juul products, including documents related to marketing and product design," the FDA stated.

The Massachusetts Attorney General Maura Healey in July 2018 investigated Juul and other online e-cigarette sellers for purportedly marketing to minors. The Attorney General's Office sent letters to two online retailers in July 2018, telling them to desist offering for sale Juul and other products in the state without setting up a system to verify the age of customers as mandated by state law. The attorney Mike Feuer of Los Angeles, CA said on October 31, 2018, that VapeCo Distribution, its other company NEwhere Inc., and Kandypens Inc. were marketing e-cigarette products to minors. The city of Los Angeles stated that the three companies are offering for sale e-cigarette products online without providing an adequate age-verification system and are targeting minors in their marketing efforts, among other things. In 2018, the attorney's office of Los Angeles had been trying to get an injunction to put an end to those practices.

There are e-cigarettes that are designed to look similar to everyday objects like USB flash drives in an effort to conceal their use from teachers and parents. For example, Juul looks like a USB flash drive that could contain music or photos. Teachers can easily be misled into believing the device is a USB flash drive. Teachers believe the device's compact design and sugary flavors are targeted at minors. "The prevalence of JUULs has also been intensified due to marketing of JUULs to high schoolers. JUULs look like flash drives because kids must hide them. No adult needs to have a vape that looks like a flash drive; they don't need to hide that," Sean Christensen, a high schooler from Towson, Maryland, stated in 2018.

The US FDA announced on September 12, 2018, that a series of critical and historic enforcement actions related to the sale and marketing of e-cigarettes to youth. In the largest coordinated enforcement effort in the FDA's history, the agency issued more than 1,300 warning letters and civil money penalty complaints (fines) to retailers who illegally sold Juul and other e-cigarette products to minors during a nationwide, undercover blitz of brick-and-mortar and online stores this summer. As a result of these violations of the law – and other indications that e-cigarette use among youth has hit epidemic proportions – FDA Commissioner Scott Gottlieb, signaled that the agency intends to take new and significant steps to address this challenge in a speech at the agency's headquarters. Juul's marketing approaches have come under scrutiny for its advertisements reportedly aimed at appealing to youth. In November 2018, Juul Labs announced they would hold off on selling the majority of its flavored e-cigarette pods in retail stores and would cease promoting is products on social media. They also stated that they would resume sales of the flavored products at retail stores that put into practice an age-verification system. Reestablishing the sales of the flavored products to retailers was not specified during the Juul announcement. Tobacco, mint, and menthol pods will still be sold to retailers. In August 2019, Juul Labs announced new protocols in the US to curb e-cigarette use among minors. The company is setting up an age-verification point-of-sale system, called the Retail Access Control Standards (RACS) program, for retailers. Retailers have stated they support the system. Health advocates are concerned that Juul could be offsetting its restrictions in the US by switching its attention to countries that are less affluent. For example, Juul's approach in the Philippines is different than in caparison with US. In the Philippines Juul sells fruit and other non-tobacco flavors, while Juul has stopped allowing these flavors to be sold by US retailers. A Juul retailer salesperson in Manila purportedly said to a teenager that Juuling is safer than smoking. On October 17, 2019, Juul announced that it would suspend the sale of its mango, creme, fruit, and cucumber flavors in the US. Mango, creme, fruit, and cucumber flavors are no longer being sold at its online store. Other countries are continuing to sell Juul's flavored pods.

Before Juul's Instagram account called JUUL vapor was shut down in November 2018, an investigation "found that over 90% of posts were related to lifestyle appeal, displaying pictures and videos meant to evoke feelings of relaxation, freedom, and sex appeal in the context of the JUUL product and flavor images." Juul's official Instagram account has closed, but others such as the #Doit4Juul hashtag stayed open. The fan account #Doit4Juul, with 110,000 followers in 2018, has different kinds of images than Juul's official Instagram account had. #Doit4Juul had an image of a bodybuilder using the Juul device who was wearing a shirt that read "Real Men Eat Ass". It also had an image of a shirtless college student with a Juul between her lips. Several new accounts have launched in 2018 on the site, such as Doingit4Juul that depicts youth using the device. Videos of young people using their Juul device in classrooms or locker rooms have appeared on social media.

"We're committed to the comprehensive approach to address addiction to nicotine that we announced last year. But at the same time, we see clear signs that youth use of electronic cigarettes has reached an epidemic proportion, and we must adjust certain aspects of our comprehensive strategy to stem this clear and present danger. This starts with the actions we're taking today to crack down on retail sales of e-cigarettes to minors. We will also revisit our compliance policy that extended the dates for manufacturers of certain flavored e-cigarettes to submit applications for premarket authorization. I believe certain flavors are one of the principal drivers of the youth appeal of these products. While we remain committed to advancing policies that promote the potential of e-cigarettes to help adult smokers move away from combustible cigarettes, that work can't come at the expense of kids. We cannot allow a whole new generation to become addicted to nicotine. In the coming weeks, we'll take additional action under our Youth Tobacco Prevention Plan to immediately address the youth access to, and the appeal of, these products," said FDA Commissioner Gottlieb, on September 12, 2018.

"Today, we asked five e-cigarette manufacturers to put forward plans to immediately and substantially reverse these trends, or face a potential decision by the FDA to reconsider extending the compliance dates for submission of premarket applications. Our comprehensive plan on nicotine and tobacco regulation remains intact and we remain committed to its goals to reduce tobacco-related disease and death, including our efforts to reduce the nicotine in combustible products to render cigarettes minimally or non-addictive. We're also fully committed to the concept that products that deliver nicotine exist on a continuum of risk, with combustible products representing the highest risk, and electronic nicotine delivery systems perhaps presenting an alternative for adult smokers who still seek access to satisfying levels of nicotine, but without all of the harmful effects that come from combustion. But in enabling a path for e-cigarettes to offer a potentially lower-risk alternative for adult smokers, we won't allow the current trends in youth access and use to continue, even if it means putting limits in place that reduce adult uptake of these products," the US FDA stated on September 12, 2018. On September 12, 2018, the US FDA issued 12 warning letters to online retailers that were selling misleadingly labeled and/or advertised e-liquids resembling kid-friendly food products such as candy and cookies.

On October 12, 2018, the US FDA sent letters to 21 e-cigarette companies, including the manufacturers and importers of Vuse Alto, myblu, Myle, Rubi and STIG, seeking information about whether more than 40 products – including some flavored e-cigarette products – are being illegally marketed and outside the agency's current compliance policy. These new actions build on those taken by the FDA in recent weeks as part of its Youth Tobacco Prevention Plan to address the epidemic of youth e-cigarette use, including cracking down on the sale and marketing of e-cigarettes to kids and educating youth about the dangers of using these products.

"Companies are on notice – the FDA will not allow the proliferation of e-cigarettes or other tobacco products potentially being marketed illegally and outside of the agency's compliance policy, and we will take swift action when companies are skirting the law. Given the explosive growth of e-cigarette use by kids, we're committed to taking whatever measures are appropriate to stem these troubling use trends. We're going to address issues related to the access kids have to e-cigarettes, as well as the youth appeal of these products. If products are being unlawfully marketed and outside the FDA's compliance policy, we'll act to remove them. This includes revisiting our compliance policy that has resulted in certain e-cigarettes, including flavored e-cigarettes, remaining on the market until 2022 while their manufacturers submit applications for premarket authorization. Further, many of these products pose particular concerns given their use of flavors. We know flavors are one of the principal drivers of the youth appeal of e-cigarettes and we're looking carefully at this," said FDA Commissioner Scott Gottlieb, on October 12, 2018.

"The FDA remains committed to the potential opportunity for e-cigarettes to help adult smokers transition away from combustible cigarettes. But we cannot allow that opportunity to come at the expense of addicting a whole new generation of kids to nicotine. We'll take forceful steps to stem the youth use, even if our actions have the unwelcome effect of impeding some opportunities for adults. These are the hard tradeoffs we now need to make. We've been warning the e-cigarette manufacturers for more than a year that they need to do more to stem youth use. No reasonable person wants to see these products reaching epidemic use among kids. Retailers and manufacturers of e-cigarettes know that the FDA is aggressively enforcing the law to ensure they are complying with prohibitions against marketing and selling to kids. Through these actions – and with more to come in the weeks and months ahead – we're committed to doing all we can to reverse the disturbing trends of youth tobacco use, especially e-cigarettes. I'll do everything I can to curb the epidemic of youth use," the US FDA stated on October 12, 2018.

In July 2019, law officials questioned Juul Labs' co-founder James Monsees about marketing approaches his company used for their e-cigarette device. Juul was suspected of targeting schools, camps, and youth programs. In summary 2018, Juul sponsored a Baltimore charter school with $134,000 in order for them to circulate materials created by Juul on how to educate children about healthy lifestyles. In April 2017, a Juul spokesperson went to the Dwight School in New York City and said to students that their e-cigarettes are "totally safe." Juul offered $10,000 to other schools throughout the US for them to be able to meet with students during school or after hours. A high school student said to the subcommittee, "Juul went into their school and gave a presentation that was supposed to be about anti-vaping. After teachers left the room, Juul gave a presentation that painted Juul as healthy, and left kids believing that they could use it without health risks." In July 2019, Courthouse News Service stated, "Robert Jackler, a researcher from Stanford University School of Medicine, testified Wednesday that Monsees had said the use of the university's tobacco ad database was 'very helpful as they designed Juul's advertising.' Monsees denied making the statement." Courthouse News Service also stated, "Rep. Mark DeSaulnier, D-Calif., said Juul had falsely claimed it had partnered with Stanford University to create a vaping prevention curriculum. In reality, the company had changed the research to suit its own needs, he said. The university has sent several cease-and-desist letters to the company."

On September 9, the US FDA issued a warning letter to Juul for marketing unauthorized modified risk tobacco products by engaging in labeling, advertising, and/or other activities directed to consumers, including a presentation given to youth at a school. The agency also issued a second letter expressing its concern – and requesting additional information – about several issues raised in a recent Congressional hearing regarding Juul's outreach and marking practices, including those targeted at students, tribes, health insurers and employers. Juul illegally marketed its nicotine e-cigarettes products as being safer than regular cigarettes, the US FDA stated. The US FDA told Juul Labs to amend its marketing practices. A Juul representative stated the company was "reviewing the letters and will fully cooperate."

Lawsuits related to youth marketing 

In November 2015, three e-cigarette users filed a class action lawsuit in the US District Court for the Central District of California for deceptive advertising against the e-liquid company Five Pawns. The lawsuit contended that Five Pawns stated it had removed diacetyl from its e-liquids. The lawsuit contended that upon further tests, many of their e-liquids were found to contain small amounts of diacetyl. The suit also contended that Five Pawns stated to its users that its e-liquids did not contain diacetyl and acetylpropionyl, when testing indicated both were found in the e-liquids, and contended that the amounts of acetyl propionyl were more than a small amount. The suit also contended that breathing in diacetyl and acetyl propionyl can lead to severe lung ailments, chronic obstructive pulmonary disease, and emphysema. An attorney, speaking on behalf of Five Pawns, stated that the company denied the allegations. Five Pawns stated that the suit is "unfounded and without merit."

In 2018, three lawsuits facing Juul Labs, contend that the company's patented formula increased their nicotine addiction. Juul falsely marketed the device as safe, when it contains higher concentrations of nicotine compared with regular cigarettes, according to complaints in the two lawsuits in California. The two lawsuits in California contend that Juul's marketing approaches were formed "around creating, and addicting, an entirely new group of customers who are not regular smokers." The lawsuit, in the US District Court in Northern California, stated that two people began using the Juul device in 2017. One of them stated that they developed an addiction to the nicotine salts and uses up more than a few Juul pods every week, according to the complaint. The other individual bought the Juul device to assist them with give up smoking, but "the intense dosage of nicotine salts delivered by the Juul products resulted in an increased nicotine addiction, and an increased consumption of nicotine," according to the complaint. The lawsuit, in the San Francisco County Superior Court, stated a person bought the Juul device with the intention of giving up smoking. The person stated that the Juul device exacerbated their nicotine addiction. The complaint stated, whereas the person "had never felt the need to smoke on a daily basis, he now finds that he feels compelled to vape Juul pods every day."

A third lawsuit in 2018, in the US District Court in Southern District of New York, came from a mother of a teen who stated her son began using the Juul device at 15 years of age. He was unable to quit using the device, the complaint contends, "even though it subjects him to disciplinary measures at home and at school." To substantiate their complaints, the three lawsuits referred to Juul's early marketing strategies, the company's patented formula, a study indicating that Juul may provide higher concentrations of nicotine than the company claimed, and a study that indicates that Juul profited from its social media promotions. Juul's campaign, costing millions of dollars, titled "Vaporized" that depicted young people in billboards in Times Square and an overt advertisement in Vice magazine were emphasized in the complaints in all three lawsuits. "Juul Labs does not believe the cases have merit and will be defending them vigorously," a Juul representative told to The Verge in July 2018.

In May 2019, a girl 15 years of age and her parents from Sarasota, Florida sued Juul Labs and Altria (owner of Philip Morris USA),  which represents a 35% interest in Juul. She began using a mango flavored Juul device at age 14 and initially did not realize it was made with nicotine, according to complaints in the lawsuit. She had seizures after using the device, also according to complaints in the lawsuit. The parents accused them of attempting to get youth addicted to its products with the use of misleading marketing methods. Juul has rejected these accusations. A spokesperson stated to Rolling Stone in May 2019 that "JUUL Labs is committed to eliminating combustible cigarettes, the number one cause of preventable death in the world. Our product is intended to be a viable alternative for current adult smokers only. We do not want non-nicotine users, especially youth, to ever try our product. To this end, we have launched an aggressive action plan to combat underage use as it is antithetical to our mission. To the extent these cases allege otherwise, they are without merit and we will defend our mission throughout this process."

In May 2019, North Carolina Attorney General Josh Stein brought a lawsuit against Juul, stating that the company targeted children. Stein requested that a court restrict the number of flavors that the company sells and make sure minors will not be able to purchase its products. In August 2019, Stein took legal action against eight e-cigarette businesses, stating that they are "unlawfully targeting children" and not mandating an age-verification process when products are being purchased. The companies listed in the lawsuits are Beard Vape, Direct eLiquid, Electric Lotus, Electric Tobacconist, Eonsmoke, Juice Man, Tinted Brew, and VapeCo.

In July 2019, a teen sued Juul in New Jersey, stating that when he was 16 he started using Juul. After a year, the teen stated he was using two pods every day. "He would JUUL during class, at home, while driving, practically anywhere that he could get away with it. He struggled to function without nicotine, and when he tried to quit using the product, he would have mood swings and become irritable," according to complaints in the lawsuit. "Like the prior cases that this one copies, it is without merit and we will defend our mission throughout this process," the company Juul stated.

In August 2019, a mother of Clay County, Missouri sued Juul in federal court, stating that the company "developed a marketing strategy" that  targets youth, such as her daughter, who were in danger of developing a nicotine addiction. Juul stated that the lawsuit is "without merit." They also stated, "We have never marketed to youth and do not want any non-nicotine users to try our products. Last year, we launched an aggressive action plan to combat underage use as it is antithetical to our mission." The daughter was 14 when she began using the Juul device in 2018, according to complaints in the lawsuit. She realized that she was unable to quit using the device, was purchasing Juul products regularly, and put on display photos of herself and acquaintances using the device on social media, also according to complaints in the lawsuit.

In August 2019, Lake County, Illinois state's attorney, Michael Nerheim sued Juul Labs, stating the company downplayed the effects of nicotine content and other substances used in the device, according to complaints in the lawsuit. Nerheim also stated that the company engaged in marketing tactics directed at underage individuals, also according to complaints in the lawsuit. "Just like cigarette companies did in the past, Juul preyed on teens by using advertisements that glamorized their product in order to get kids hooked on nicotine. It will take years of education and money to right the wrongs and cover the damages caused by Juul's marketing campaigns. To that end, the company should be held accountable for the massive expected cost to undo the damage they created," Nerheim stated in August 2019. "Juul Labs exists to help adult smokers switch from combustible cigarettes. We have never marketed to youth and do not want non-nicotine users, especially youth, to ever try our product," a Juul representative stated to CSP Daily News in August 2019. The lawsuit in Illinois also stated that Juul promoted its products on social media to influence young people to post selfies of themselves vaping with the device. "We have exited Instagram and Facebook and work constantly to remove inappropriate social media content generated by others," a Juul representative wrote to NBC News in August 2019.

In August 2019, a Park Ridge, Illinois teenager sued Juul Labs and Altria for "fraudulent and deceptive youth marketing business practices" that allegedly resulted in him developing an addition to nicotine. The teenager stated that the companies marketed their products to underage individuals without telling them about the dangers, according to complaints in the lawsuit. In August 2019, Juul stated, in a respond to the lawsuit, it has "never marketed to youth and do not want non-nicotine users, especially youth, to ever try our product." Altria stated in August 2019 that "virtually all of the conduct alleged in the complaint occurred before Altria had any economic interest in Juul." Two days after the suit was filed, the teenager filed for a voluntary dismissal, and it was dismissed without prejudice.

On September 13, 2019, an 18-year-old student is taking legal action in Illinois against Juul after doctors told him his lungs are like that of a 70-year-old.

"The suggestion that only black market vape products are connected to vape-related deaths and illness is entirely inaccurate, if you ask two lawyers representing the mother of 18-year-old David Wakefield who suffered from asthma and died while fighting a two-year addiction to Juul Labs Inc.'s nicotine e-cigarettes," Alexis Keenan, a Yahoo! Finance reporter, stated on October 15, 2019. A wrongful death lawsuit, filed on October 15, 2019, in the US District Court in Northern California, was brought against Juul Labs. The family states their 18-year-old son died in his sleep in August 2018 as a result of Juuling for years. On the night he died, he was not showing any signs of breathing problems, according to his mother. He was a healthy teenager until he started Juuling at 15, according to the complaint. In under a year of Juuling, the teenager had terrible mood swings and his efforts in school dropped, according to the complaint. The teenager was enticed, the complaint contends, to Juul's "candy-like flavors, sleek and discreet design, and its representations that it was a healthier alternative to combustible cigarettes."

E-cigarette liquid marketing 

It is difficult for consumers to know what e-cigarette products contain. For example, some e-cigarettes marketed as containing zero percent nicotine have been found to contain nicotine. A 2010 study indicated that "ENDS advertised as containing E-Cialis did not contain tadalafil (ie, Cialis) but contained its analogue amino-tadalafil, and that ENDS advertised as containing E-Rimonabant contained rimonabant and an oxidative impurity of rimonabant. These products contained nicotine, even though they were advertised as containing no nicotine." Such products state to contain Cialis, for erectile dysfunction, and rimonabant, for weight loss, but the efficacy or safety of containing these ingredients have not evaluated. A 2010 study suggested that e-cigarettes were marketed in 7764 different flavors. The use of marketing terms such as "e-juice" may further mislead consumers into believing that these products are harmless and safe for consumption. E-liquids are often flavored, with thousands of unique flavors advertised. Availability of flavors is among the most prominently cited reasons for youth e-cigarette use. Popular options, including fruit, candy, and dessert, are particularly appealing to children and youth, more appealing than tobacco-flavors. Further, adolescents perceive that e-cigarettes with flavors are less harmful than those with tobacco flavors, creating a potential misperception that e-cigarettes with flavors do not contain nicotine.

E-liquid companies have used cartoons to promote their products. Many e-liquid companies have used cartoon imagery as part of their logo. This indicates that cartoon imagery is a strong part to their brand identity. Leading e-cigarette businesses have used novel marketing techniques such as creating products that resembles the labeling of cookies, juice boxes, and whipped cream. They are marketed in alluring flavors resembling candy, which could cause children to consider ingesting the liquid nicotine. Containers for e-liquids (the liquid used in vape products) can seem tempting to children of all ages for many reasons. For example, some e-liquids may have labeling or advertising that misleads youth into thinking the products are things they would eat or drink – like a juice box, piece of candy, or cookie. But these products are not meant for children, the US FDA stated in 2018.

E-cigarette advertisements featuring unicorns are used to market a variety of unicorn-themed e-liquids. In e-cigarette advertisements, the e-liquid flows out from the unicorn in the appearance of a rainbow of colors. The marketed unicorn-themed flavors were unicorn milk, unicorn cream, unicorn juice, unicorn magic, unicorn blood, unicorn poop, unicorn piss, unicorn tears, unicorn puke, unicorn vomit, unicorn spew, unicorn breath, unicorn jizz, unicorn porn, unicorn sprinkles, unicorn dust, unicorn cake, unicorn horn, unicorn slayer, unicorn killer, unicorn revenge, unicorn roar, and unicorn clouds. The Vapor Chef, on their website in 2016, described their unicorn poop e-liquid: "...everyone knows Unicorns are made of cupcakes and rainbows! This tastes like blueberry cupcakes with white chocolate frosting and a raspberry on top!" In an interview with The New York Times in 2015, a teenager characterized the unicorn puke as "every flavor Skittle compressed into one." Youth-oriented flavors such as unicorn vomit, is an area of concern.

A lot of products are marketed as being sweet, or provide the taste resembling sweetness and could include sweeteners. For instance, 37 e-liquid samples were analyzed and all the samples contained sucrose which widely ranged from 0.76 to 72.93 μg/g. It was unclear the source of the sucrose. Sucrose may be toxic because it generates aldehydes when heated at high enough temperatures, is an area of concern. Sweet flavors could be more enticing. The flavors considered more sweet were more enticing than non-sweet flavors among young adult frequent e-cigarette users, in a 2016 study.

A 2014 policy statement by the UK's Faculty of Public Health has stated, "A key concern for everyone in public health is that children and young people are being targeted by mass advertising of e-cigarettes. There is a danger that e-cigarettes will lead to young people and non-smokers becoming addicted to nicotine and smoking. Evidence from the US backs up this concern." E-cigarette marketing approaches at the 2017 World Vapor Expo held in Miami, Florida, US in 2017 included providing samples of candy-flavored e-liquids along with actual matching candy samples. A 2018 report stated, "E-cigarette marketing strategies such as those observed at the 2017 World Vapor Expo echo earlier cigarette promotions infamously used by the tobacco industry to attract consumers, most notably teenagers."

As part of ongoing efforts to protect youth from the dangers of nicotine and tobacco products, the US FDA and the Federal Trade Commission announced on May 1, 2018, they issued 13 warning letters to manufacturers, distributors, and retailers for selling e-liquids used in e-cigarettes with labeling and/or advertising that cause them to resemble kid-friendly food products, such as juice boxes, candy or cookies, some of them with cartoon-like imagery. Some examples of the products outlined in the warning letters, and being sold through multiple online retailers, include: "One Mad Hit Juice Box," which resembles children's apple juice boxes, such as Tree Top-brand juice boxes; "Vape Heads Sour Smurf Sauce," which resembles War Heads candy; and "V'Nilla Cookies & Milk," which resembles Nilla Wafer and Golden Oreo cookies. Other products include "Whip'd Strawberry," which resembles Reddi-whip dairy whipped topping, and "Twirly Pop," which not only resembles a Unicorn Pop lollipop but is shipped with one.

"No child should be using any tobacco product, and no tobacco products should be marketed in a way that endangers kids – especially by using imagery that misleads them into thinking the products are things they would eat or drink. Looking at these side-to-side comparisons is alarming. It is easy to see how a child could confuse these e-liquid products for something they believe they have consumed before – like a juice box. These are preventable accidents that have the potential to result in serious harm or even death. Companies selling these products have a responsibility to ensure they are not putting children in harm's way or enticing youth use, and we'll continue to take action against those who sell tobacco products to youth and market products in this egregious fashion," the US FDA Commissioner Dr. Scott Gottlieb, said in 2018.

The US FDA stated in a warning letter to Virtue Vape, LLC on May 10, 2018, that the labeling and/or advertising of the Unicorn Cakes e-liquid causes it to imitate a food product, particularly one that is marketed toward, and/or appealing to, children. Specifically, the labeling and/or advertising of the product uses images and cartoons of pancakes and a strawberry beverage, which are food products that are marketed toward, and/or appealing to, children. For example, the labeling and/or advertising for Unicorn Cakes e-liquid prominently displays on the front of the product the term "UNICORN CAKES," and features images of blueberry pancakes and strawberry colored liquid. The labeling and/or advertising also includes cartoon imagery of unicorns eating pancakes in a fanciful landscape, which is substantially similar to graphics/images from My Little Pony, an entertainment franchise marketed toward, and popular among, children. The use of this cartoon imagery further enhances its appeal to children and increases the likelihood that children will ingest the product as a food. Additionally, the website Virtue Vape describes the product as "[a]n incredible blueberry pancake drenched in strawberry milk." Further, Unicorn Cakes e-liquid has a strong scent like berries and pancakes. This labeling and/or advertising causes the product to imitate breakfast food and cartoon images that are marketed toward, and/or appealing to, children, and is therefore misleading. In May 2018, Catalina Velasquez of Virtue Vape stated, "We never did it to connect with children, it was to remind grown-ups of when they were a kid."

Children are at particular risk for ingesting e-liquid products with labeling and/or advertising that causes the product to imitate a food or beverage, particularly a food or beverage that is typically marketed toward, and/or appealing to, children. Moreover, children are at particular risk because exposure to the nicotine in the e-liquid product, even in relatively small amounts, could result in acute toxicity. Child poisonings due to the ingestion of liquid nicotine have recently increased substantially. Severe harms can occur in small children from ingestion of liquid nicotine, including death from cardiac arrest, as well as seizure, coma, and respiratory arrest.
 
Given that the labeling and/or advertising on Unicorn Cakes e-liquid describes its nicotine content as 3 mg/mL, with a total volume of 120 mL, an accidental ingestion of slightly less than a teaspoon would reach the lower end of the fatal dose range for an average two-year-old. Additionally, an accidental ingestion of approximately 3% of a teaspoon would reach the lower end of the non-fatal acute toxicity range for an average two-year-old.

Marketing regulation

International 

Regulations for e-cigarette advertising vary internationally.  For instance, Brazil prohibited the selling and advertising of e-cigarettes in 2013, whereas Finland regarded them as medical products and prohibited just the advertising in 2013. Many countries lack specific regulations for e-cigarette use and e-cigarette advertising. This results in large-scale e-cigarette advertising. In the US and many other countries, e-cigarettes are not subject to the same marketing and promotion restrictions that apply to traditional cigarettes. As a result, e-cigarette businesses are permitted to advertise on television and in mass media as well as through newer channels such as the Internet. 48 countries worldwide have implemented regulations for the marketing of e-cigarettes, as of 2017. Of those, eight countries have implemented limitations just to nicotine-based e-cigarettes or have controlled them as medicines. A 2014 World Health Organization survey found 39 countries containing 31% of the population globally have thorough advertising, promotion and sponsorship bans in regard to e-cigarettes, and 19 countries containing 5% of the population globally mandate e-cigarettes to be reviewed before being placed on the market. The sale of nicotine-containing e-cigarettes is prohibited in 13 of the 59 countries that have laws for such products, according to the 2014 World Health Organization report. Most of these 13 countries stated that nicotine-containing e-cigarettes are sold to the general population, which may be through unlawful trade and from sales online from another country. The World Health Organization report also found 29 countries containing 8% of the population globally have policies on e-cigarette sales to minors. Where noted, age requirements for buying varied from 18 to 21 years. Some countries do not have formal advertising and promotion restrictions, but maintain that such restrictions are inferred as part of their restrictions on the selling of such products. These include Argentina and Australia.

There are still many unresolved questions with respect to how the selling and marketing of e-cigarettes ought to be regulated. It is possible that e-cigarette regulation will effect marketing. Tighter regulations for the marketing and advertising of e-cigarettes has been recommended. Ways to minimize the scope of the tobacco epidemic include strongly reinforcing current tobacco control measures. This includes tighter regulations for advertising. It is recommended that regulatory measures should be implemented for e-cigarettes or nicotine-containing products because of the adverse effects of nicotine exposure on the developing human brain. To cut down the possible adverse consequences concerning prevention and quitting smoking and the undoing of existing tobacco control strategies, it is strongly recommended vaping be banned where traditional cigarettes are banned, and they be put under the same marketing limitations as traditional cigarettes. A 2016 World Health Organization report suggested prohibiting or limiting advertising, promotion, and sponsorship of e-cigarettes. Regulation of the production and promotion of e-cigarettes may help lower some of the adverse effects associated with tobacco use. A 2017 review stated, "In the absence of conclusive evidence of safety and the health impact of the use of the e-cigarette, it is recommended that there should be restrictions on advertising of e-cigarettes, especially e-liquids of fruit and sweet flavors which are particularly likely to encourage young people to start using the e-cigarette."

Whether e-cigarettes reduce or increase health risks relies on an intricate and changing interactivity among the businesses marketing e-cigarettes, users, regulators, and scientists, among other things. Assertions of effectiveness as a quitting smoking tool have been seen in e-cigarette advertisements in the US, UK, and China, despite such assertions had not been supported by regulatory bodies. E-cigarettes containing nicotine have been listed as drug delivery devices in a number of countries, and the marketing of such products has been restricted or put on hold until safety and efficacy clinical trials are conclusive. E-cigarettes and the marketing and regulatory landscape are quickly changing, all of which may impact the connection between vaping and giving up smoking.

Tobacco businesses have partnered with organizations formed to promote vaping, including the Electronic Cigarette Association, Consumer Advocates for Smoke-Free Alternatives Association, and Vapers International, Inc. These establishments, and other interested parties, have made an effort to impede or put an end to legislation intended at restricting their sale and use.

United States 

A 2016 report found "In 2013, third-party organizations including industry-funded think tanks, business organizations (eg, chambers of commerce), and hospitality associations, as well as front groups, started opposing efforts to include e-cigarettes in existing retail licensing and smokefree laws." In 2015, there was limited restrictions in the US on the marketing of e-cigarettes. Since they do not contain tobacco, television advertising in the US was not restricted in 2015. In 2016 in the US, e-cigarettes were not mandated to undergo testing prior to marketing. A 2015 review strongly recommended marketing restrictions in the US to prevent intended and unintended advertising and promotion of these products to young people, particularly those who are non-smokers or are below the minimum smoking age. Examples of marketing restrictions the review recommended were prohibiting sponsoring events, concerts, and sporting events frequented by youth. The Tobacco Master Settlement Agreement forbids tobacco companies from using cartoon characters in the US, but no such law has been enacted in the US for e-cigarettes, as of 2019.

After proposing the "Deeming Rule" in 2014, the US FDA began regulating the manufacturing, marketing, and sales of e-cigarette products as tobacco products in 2016. The manufacturing, marketing, and sales of e-cigarette products in the US were not under the jurisdiction of federal regulations until May 2016 when the US FDA published its finalized Deeming Rule, granting the US FDA federal regulatory authority over e-cigarettes, cigars, and hookah tobacco products equivalent to the rules in place for traditional cigarettes and smokeless tobacco. The US FDA regulates the manufacture, import, packaging, labeling, advertising, promotion, sale, and distribution of e-cigarettes. This includes components and parts of e-cigarettes but excludes accessories. Effective May 10, 2018, vape shop retailers were prohibited from selling or distributing e-cigarettes or other vape products without including a health warning statement on the product packaging and from displaying e-cigarette or other vape product advertisements without including a health warning statement on the advertisements.

Internet marketers have advocated that trying to regulate vaping in the US would constrain innovation and restrict choices for people trying to give up smoking. A 2010 US district court decision blocked e-cigarette manufacturers from marketing e-cigarettes as quit-smoking devices. However, advertisers use indirect tactics such as affiliate marketing to circumvent that decision; claims about the products' health and safety profile and their role in smoking cessation may be commonplace on social networks despite the ruling. E-cigarettes are often marketed and displayed on countertops near till points and next to products of particular interest to children and adolescents; this may lead to the embracing of e-cigarettes as a broadly used and accepted product. However, several US jurisdictions have passed laws that increased the minimum age of sale for all tobacco products, including e-cigarettes, to 21 years.

The Family Smoking Prevention and Tobacco Control Act of 2009 which is a federal statute in the US, banned the sale of cigarettes with flavors except for menthol and tobacco. The law did not disallow other flavored tobacco products. In 2017, the marketing of flavored non-cigarette tobacco products was widely permitted, and the tobacco industry persistently introduced non-cigarette products in new flavors. In the last few years leading up to 2017, tobacco makers have substantially increased the marketing of non-cigarette tobacco products containing flavors. This includes e-cigarettes and cigars. In 2017, San Francisco passed a ruling to ban the sales of all flavored nicotine products. This law originated from concerns that these flavored products are directly aimed at youth and people of color. Reynolds Tobacco Company began gathering signatures to suspend the ruling before it became law. An adequate number of signatures were collected to put the ruling to a public vote in front of San Francisco voters. Despite $12 million being spent mostly by R. J. Reynolds Tobacco Company against the ban, San Francisco voters passed a measure known as Proposition E that effectively bans the sale of flavored tobacco products, including flavored e-liquids on June 5, 2018. They are the first city in the US to enact such a ban. It passed by a 68% to 32% margin and it became law on July 20, 2018. The American Lung Association said that "San Francisco's youth are routinely bombarded with advertising for flavored tobacco and e-cigarettes every time they walk into a neighborhood convenience store. It's clear that these products with candy themes and colorful packaging are geared towards teens." Supporters of Proposition E stated that it would shield the children of San Francisco from being marketed candy flavored tobacco products (including flavored e-liquids). Opponents of Proposition E stated that disallowing flavored tobacco products (including flavored e-liquids) would just not work and compared it to the lack of success for both the prohibition of alcohol and on the war on drugs to restrict marijuana use.

In June 2019, city officials voted to approved an ordinance to ban the sale of e-cigarettes in San Francisco, CA. In July 2019, Mayor London Breed signed the ordinance that effectively bans the sale of e-cigarettes. San Francisco will be the first city in the US to outlaw the sale of these products. The ban will be implemented into law in early 2020, seven months after the ordinance was signed. In June 2019, the city officials voted in agreement to ban the sale of cigarettes, cigars, e-cigarettes and other tobacco products in Beverly Hills, CA, starting in 2021.

Effective on September 4, 2019, Michigan plans on becoming the first state in the US to prohibit the sales of flavored nicotine vaping products. Marketing messages such as "clean," "safe", and "healthy" are also part of the restriction for such products. "As governor, my number one priority is keeping our kids safe and right now, companies selling vaping products are using candy flavors to hook children on nicotine and misleading claims to promote the belief that these products are safe. That ends today," said Michigan governor Gretchen Whitmer, on September 4, 2019.

When FDA Commissioner Scott Gottlieb announced the FDA's Comprehensive Plan for Tobacco and Nicotine Regulation in July 2017, he made clear his concerns about youth use of e-cigarettes, especially those products marketed with obviously kid-appealing flavors. On November 15, 2018, Scott Gottlieb, directed the FDA's Center for Tobacco Products (CTP) to revisit this compliance policy as it applies to deemed e-cigarette products that are flavored, including all flavors other than tobacco, mint and menthol. The changes he seeks would protect youth by having all flavored e-cigarette products (other than tobacco, mint and menthol flavors or non-flavored products) sold in age-restricted, in-person locations and, if sold online, under heightened practices for age verification. These changes will not include mint- and menthol-flavored e-liquids, the FDA stated. In 2018 the US FDA decided to create new regulations to ban the sale of e-liquid flavors at convenience stores and gas stations, with the intent of decreasing the use of e-cigarettes among young people. Tobacco, mint, and menthol flavors will still be allowed at convenience stores, gas stations, and other places where they are sold. Fruity-type flavors can only be sold at places where adults shop, such as vape shops.

In March 2019, Nancy Brown, CEO of the American Heart Association, stated, "the FDA should prohibit companies from marketing their products in ways that appeal to kids. Without immediate and urgent action pertaining to flavored tobacco products, the epidemic of e-cigarettes will continue to undo decades of progress in tobacco control." "Under my leadership, the FDA will continue to tackle the troubling epidemic of e-cigarette use among kids. This includes limiting youth access to, and appeal of, flavored tobacco products like e-cigarettes and cigars, taking action against manufacturers and retailers who illegally market these products or sell them to minors, and educating youth about the dangers of e-cigarettes and other tobacco products. We cannot and will not risk a generation of youth to a lifetime of nicotine addiction. We appreciate the FTC joining us on these and other actions to protect youth from the dangers of nicotine and tobacco products," said Acting FDA Commissioner Ned Sharpless, M.D., in June 2019. In July 2019, the US FDA launched its first television advertisement campaign aimed at preventing vaping among teens. "The Real Cost" campaign includes television commercials highlighting street magician Julius Dein usng illusions to inform teens about the drawbacks of vaping. On July 22, 2019, the US FDA announced that these advertisements will run on television networks such as TeenNick, The CW, ESPN and MTV, as well as on music streaming sites, social media networks and other teen-focused media channels.

Europe 

The revised EU Tobacco Products Directive came into effect May 2016, providing regulation for e-cigarettes. It limits e-cigarette advertising in print, on television and radio, along with reducing the level of nicotine in liquids and reducing the flavors used. This law does not pertain to products that do not contain nicotine such as e-cigarettes that do not contain nicotine. The law does not regulate posters, leaflets, or point of sale e-cigarette advertisements. It also does not regulate marketing materials that portray them as glamorous. Promotion of e-cigarettes and e-liquids in print media, television, or radio media is banned. Promotional materials on the packaging of such products is banned. Advertising and promotion of e-cigarettes is banned in neighboring countries. The law still allows certain types of e-cigarette advertising such as posters, leaflets, and billboards in shops. A 2014 review stated that tobacco and e-cigarette businesses interact with consumers for their policy agenda. The businesses use websites, social media, and marketing to get consumers involved in opposing bills that include e-cigarettes in smoke-free laws. This is similar to tobacco industry activity going back to the 1980s. These approaches were used in Europe to minimize the EU Tobacco Products Directive in October 2013.

General themes that were seen in marketing of e-cigarettes are health, lifestyle, and personalization. Wordings implicating the product is a healthier alternative are often used in marketing, such as "natural," "food- or pharma grade," "homeopathic," and "made in Switzerland." These terms refer to the plastics or e-liquid used or more specifically to the nicotine in the product. However, in most countries, worldwide restrictions on tobacco advertising are active. Before May 20, 2016, European regulations advised "to adopt a restrictive approach to advertising electronic cigarettes and refill containers." Following the EU Tobacco Product Directive, which became effective on May 20, 2016, advertisements or promotions for tobacco products, including e-cigarettes, are no longer permitted.

The Advertising Standards Authority banned two E-Lites e-cigarette advertisements and an e-cigarette television advertisement by SKYCIG (now known as blu eCigs or simply blu) in 2013. The E-Lites e-cigarette advertisements on television and radio were banned in 2013 because they did not make it evident that the product delivered nicotine. The Advertising Standards Authority stated that the three advertisements did not clearly indicate that nicotine is used in the products. In 2014, the Advertising Standards Authority banned a Ten Motives television advertisement for e-cigarettes for making unproven health claims. The Advertising Standards Authority determined that additional evidence provided by Ten Motives that they reviewed did not support that vaping or for their products explicitly as being safer than traditional cigarettes. The Advertising Standards Authority came to the conclusion that the statements "the healthier smoking alternative" and "you can still enjoy smoking without worrying about the effects on your health" were not accurate. In 2014, the Advertising Standards Authority banned a Vype television advertisement for e-cigarettes because it potentially promoted vaping as a way to quit smoking. The Advertising Standards Authority determined that the statements "pure satisfaction for smokers" and "experience the breakthrough" were likely to be construed as meaning smokers could get satisfaction from vaping rather than cigarette smoking. Revised advertising regulations for e-cigarettes in the UK were announced in October 2014.

In 2014, the Advertising Standards Authority banned a VIP television advertisement for e-cigarettes for its possibility of glamorizing smoking. In 2015, the Advertising Standards Authority banned a Mirage Cigarettes television advertisement for e-cigarettes for appearing to promote tobacco use. The Advertising Standards Authority banned a billboard advertisement in the UK that depicted Santa Claus using an e-cigarette, because they determined the advertisement may appeal to individuals who are under 18. A billboard advertisement with an elf as well as another with a gingerbread man, also advertised in the UK in December 2016, were also banned by the Advertising Standards Authority. It is against the law in the UK to advertise e-cigarettes that would likely be appealing to those below 18. In August 2019, the Advertising Standards Authority banned a Diamond Mist Eliquids advertisement in the UK that suggested Olympic athlete Mo Farah endorsed the product.

Canada 

In late November 2015, Bill 44 was passed by the National Assembly, which regulates e-cigarettes as tobacco products in Quebec, Canada. It bans using e-cigarettes in vape shops, bans indoor displays and advertising, and bans sales on their websites. Canada-wide in 2014, e-cigarettes were technically illegal to sell or advertise, as no nicotine-containing e-cigarettes are not regulated by Health Canada, but this is generally unenforced and they are commonly available for sale Canada-wide. In November 2016, Health Canada announced plans to regulate e-cigarette products. "The new federal legislation will deal with areas of federal responsibility, such as advertising and promotion, packaging, the product itself, use in federally regulated workplaces and public places," Rob Cunningham, a top policy analyst at the Canadian Cancer Society, stated in 2016. On May 23, 2018, Bill S-5 introduced regulations for e-cigarettes and other tobacco products. It does not allow the promotion of e-cigarettes that are enticing to youth. This includes enticing flavors such as dessert flavors. It bans the advertising of e-cigarettes as a lifestyle product. There are restrictions on various kinds of e-cigarette promotions, which include sponsorships and celebrity endorsements.

Advertisement bans 

Following concerns over cases of vaping-induced lung illness and deaths in the US in 2019, CNN no longer accepts advertisements from vaping companies. CBS, WarnerMedia, and Viacom have also stopped accepting advertisements from vaping companies. "Given warnings from the CDC, the AMA and the American Lung Association to consumers, our company has revised its policies regarding e-cigarette advertising, and will no longer accept advertising for this category. We will continue to monitor the investigations by relevant medical agencies and may re-evaluate our position as new facts come to light," a WarnerMedia representative told to CNBC.

Gallery

Bibliography

References 

Cigarette types
Tobacco advertising
Electronic cigarettes
Non-tobacco nicotine products